This is an incomplete list of the 2945 Statutory Instruments published in the United Kingdom in the year 1991.



1-100
Valuation and Community Charge Tribunals (Amendment)(London) Regulations 1991 SI 1991/1
Farm Diversification Grant (Variation) Scheme 1991 SI 1991/2
Apple Orchard Grubbing Up Regulations 1991 SI 1991/3
Occupational Pension Schemes (Transitional Provisions and Savings) Amendment Regulations 1991 SI 1991/4
Food Protection (Emergency Prohibitions) (Radioactivity in Sheep) (Wales) Order 1991 SI 1991/5
Food Protection (Emergency Prohibitions) (Radioactivity in Sheep) (England) Order 1991 SI 1991/6
Blood Tests (Evidence of Paternity) (Amendment) Regulations 1991 SI 1991/12
Companies (Defective Accounts) (Authorised Person) Order 1991 SI 1991/13
Act of Adjournal (Consolidation Amendment) (Extradition Rules and Backing of Irish Warrants) 1991 SI 1991/19
Food Protection (Emergency Prohibitions) (Radioactivity in Sheep) Order 1991 SI 1991/20
Act of Sederunt (Applications in the Sheriff Court in respect of Defective Company Accounts) 1991 SI 1991/24
London-Holyhead Trunk Road (A5) (Ty-nant to Dinmael) Order 1991 SI 1991/26
Industrial Training (Construction Board) Order 1964 (Amendment) Order 1991 SI 1991/28
Banking Act 1987 (Exempt Transactions) (Amendment) Regulations 1991 SI 1991/29
Cholderton (Pipelaying and Other Works) (Code of Practice) Order 1991 SI 1991/31
Public Telecommunications System Designated (Cable Enfield Limited) Order 1991 SI 1991/32
Public Telecommunications System Designated (Cable North (Forth District) Limited) (Falkirk and West Lothian) Order 1991 SI 1991/33
Public Telecommunications System Designated (Cablevision Communications Company Limited) (Central Hertfordshire) Order 1991 SI 1991/34
Buckinghamshire County Council Downhead Park to Willen Park (Canal Bridge) Scheme 1989 Confirmation Instrument 1991 SI 1991/37
Buckinghamshire County Council H8 Standing Way (V8-V10) Dualling (Canal Bridge) Scheme 1990 Confirmation Instrument 1991 SI 1991/38
Standard Community Charge (Scotland) Amendment Regulations 1991 SI 1991/41
Non-Domestic Rates (Scotland) Regulations 1991 SI 1991/42
Caledonian MacBrayne Limited (Arinagour Pier) Harbour Revision Order 1990 SI 1991/43
Buckinghamshire County Council H5 Portway (V9-V10) Dualling (Canal Bridge) Scheme 1990 Confirmation Instrument 1991 SI 1991/45
Community Charges (Registration) (Scotland) (No. 2) Amendment Regulations 1991 SI 1991/51
Customs and Excise (Community Transit) (No.2) Regulations 1987 (Amendment) Regulations 1991 SI 1991/52
General Medical Council (Registration (Fees) (Amendment) Regulations) Order of Council 1991 SI 1991/53
Public Telecommunications System Designation (East London Telecommunications Limited) (Waltham Forest) Order 1991 SI 1991/54
Public Telecommunication System Designation (Starside Network Limited) Order 1991 SI 1991/55
Public Telecommunication System Designation (Stort Valley Cable Limited) (Harlow and Bishops Stortford) Order 1991 SI 1991/56
Combined Probation Areas (Essex) Order 1991 SI 1991/57
Export of Sheep (Prohibition) Order 1991 SI 1991/58
Gaming (Amendment) Act 1990 (Commencement) Order 1991 SI 1991/59
Gaming Act (Variation of Fees) Order 1991 SI 1991/60
Lotteries (Gaming Board Fees) Order 1991 SI 1991/61
Relevant Population (England) (Amendment) Regulations 1991 SI 1991/64
Merchant Shipping (Pilot Boats) Regulations 1991 SI 1991/65
Banking Act 1987 (Exempt Persons) Order 1991 SI 1991/66
Combined Probation Areas (Cornwall) Order 1991 SI 1991/68
Combined Probation Areas (Greater Manchester) Order 1991 SI 1991/69
National Savings Bank (Amendment)Regulations 1991 SI 1991/72
Premium Savings Bonds (Amendment) Regulations 1991 SI 1991/73
Savings Certificates (Amendment) Regulations 1991 SI 1991/74
Savings Certificates (Yearly Plan) (Amendment) Regulations 1991 SI 1991/75
Savings Contracts (Amendment) Regulations 1991 SI 1991/76
Immigration (Variation of Leave) Order 1991 SI 1991/77
Local Government Superannuation (Scotland) Amendment Regulations 1991 SI 1991/78
General Optical Council (Registration and Enrolment (Amendment No. 2) Rules) Order of Council 1991 SI 1991/79
Housing Renovation etc. Grants (Prescribed Forms and Particulars) (Welsh Forms and Particulars) Regulations 1991 SI 1991/80
Public Telecommunications System Designation (Cable Communications (Liverpool) Limited) Order 1991 SI 1991/81
Public Telecommunication System Designation (Staffordshire Cable Limited) (Stoke-on-Trent and Newcastle under Lyme) Order 1991 SI 1991/82
A30 Trunk Road (Okehampton to Launceston Improvement and Slip Roads) Order 1991 SI 1991/84
A30 Trunk Road (Okehampton to Launceston Improvement)(Detrunking) Order 1991 SI 1991/85
Electricity (Restrictive Trade Practices Act 1976) (Exemptions) Amendment Order 1991 SI 1991/88
Employment Act 1990 (Commencement and Transitional Provisions) Amendment Order 1991 SI 1991/89
Environmental Protection Act 1990 (Commencement No. 5) Order 1991 SI 1991/96
Local Authorities (Capital Finance) (Rate of Discount for 1991/92) Regulations 1991 SI 1991/97
Food Safety (Improvement and Prohibition-Prescribed Forms) Regulations 1991 SI 1991/100

101-200
Sealink (Transfer of Fishbourne Terminal) Harbour Revision Order 1991 SI 1991/106
Sealink (Transfer of Ryde Pier) Harbour Revision Order 1991 SI 1991/107
Sealink (Transfer of Landing Stage at Portsmouth Harbour) Harbour Revision Order 1991 SI 1991/108
Northern Devon Healthcare National Health Service Trust (Establishment) Order 1991 SI 1991/109
Food Protection (Emergency Prohibitions) (Lead in Cattle) (England) (No. 2) (Revocation) Order 1991 SI 1991/110
Litter (Fixed Penalty Notices) Order 1991 SI 1991/111
A158 Trunk Road (Lincolnshire) (Detrunking) Order 1991 SI 1991/112
Ermine Street (A15) (North Lincolnshire) (Trunking) Order 1991 SI 1991/113
Non-Domestic Rates (Scotland) (No.2) Regulations 1991 SI 1991/114
River Awe Salmon Fishery District (Baits and Lures) Regulations 1991 SI 1991/116
Public Telecommunication System Designation (Sheffield Cable Media Limited) Order 1991 SI 1991/117
Community Charges and Non-Domestic Rating (Demand Notices) (Wales) (Amendment) Regulations 1991 SI 1991/118
Petty Sessional Divisions (Essex) Order 1991 SI 1991/121
Education (Grants) (Travellers and Displaced Persons) (Amendment) Regulations 1991 SI 1991/131
Government Trading Act 1990 (Appointed Day) Order 1991 SI 1991/132
A423 Trunk Road (Southam Bypass) Order 1990 SI 1991/133
Bitton Light Railway Order 1991 SI 1991/134
Nurses, Midwives and Health Visitors (Registration) Modification Rules Approved Order 1991 SI 1991/135
Sea Fishing (Enforcement of Community Quota Measures) Order 1991 SI 1991/138
Sea Fishing (Days in Port) Regulations 1991 SI 1991/139
Community Charges (Administration and Enforcement) (Amendment) Regulations 1991 SI 1991/140
Non-Domestic Rating (Collection and Enforcement) (Local Lists) (Amendment and Miscellaneous Provision) Regulations 1991 SI 1991/141
Non-Domestic Rating (Collection and Enforcement) (Central Lists) (Amendment) Regulations 1991 SI 1991/142
Act of Sederunt (Applications under Part VII of the Companies Act 1989) 1991 SI 1991/145
Financial Assistance (Sewerage Improvements) (Scotland) Order 1991 SI 1991/146
Town and Country Planning (General Development) (Scotland) Amendment Order 1991 SI 1991/147
Community Charges and Non-Domestic Rating (Demand Notices) (England) Regulations 1991 SI 1991/148
Community Charges and Non-Domestic Rating (Demand Notices) (City of London) Regulations 1991 SI 1991/149
International Fund for Agricultural Development (Third Replenishment) Order 1991 SI 1991/150
Returning Officers (Parliamentary Constituencies) (England and Wales) (Amendment) Order 1991 SI 1991/152
Combined Probation Areas (Essex) (No. 2) Order 1991 SI 1991/156
Building Standards (Relaxation by Local Authorities) (Scotland) Regulations 1991 SI 1991/158
Building (Procedure) (Scotland) Amendment Regulations 1991 SI 1991/159
Building (Forms) (Scotland) Regulations 1991 SI 1991/160
M5 Birmingham-Exeter Motorway (Strensham Re-Located Northbound Service Area) Connecting Roads Scheme 1991 SI 1991/162
Contracting-Out (Protection of Pensions) Regulations 1991 SI 1991/166
Occupational Pension Schemes (Preservation of Benefit) Regulations 1991 SI 1991/167
Occupational Pension Schemes (Revaluation) Regulations 1991 SI 1991/168
Public Telecommunication System Designation (British Cable Services Limited) (Cardiff) Order 1991 SI 1991/172
Public Telecommunication System Designation (United Artists Communications (South Thames Estuary) Limited) Order 1991 SI 1991/173
City of London (Non-Domestic Rating Multiplier) Order 1991 SI 1991/182
British Nationality (Fees) (Amendment) Regulations 1991 SI 1991/183
Education (London Residuary Body) (Capital Money) Order 1991 SI 1991/184
Rates and Precepts (Final Adjustments) Order 1991 SI 1991/185
Value Added Tax Tribunals (Amendment) Rules 1991 SI 1991/186
European Communities (Designation) Order 1991 SI 1991/187
Transfer of Functions (Minister for the Civil Service and Treasury) Order 1991 SI 1991/188
Air Navigation (Overseas Territories) (Amendment) Order 1991 SI 1991/189
Foreign Compensation (Financial Provisions) Order 1991 SI 1991/190
Broadcasting Act 1990 (Guernsey) Order 1991 SI 1991/191
Broadcasting Act 1990 (Isle of Man) Order 1991 SI 1991/192
Broadcasting Act 1990 (Jersey) Order 1991 SI 1991/193
Health and Personal Social Services(Northern Ireland) Order 1991 SI 1991/194
Health and Personal Social Services(Northern Ireland Consequential Amendments)Order 1991 SI 1991/195
Redundancy Fund (Abolition) (Northern Ireland) Order 1991 SI 1991/196
Road Traffic (Amendment) (Northern Ireland) Order 1991 SI 1991/197
Civil Aviation (Canadian Navigation Services) (Third Amendment) Regulations 1991 SI 1991/198
Price Indications (Method of Payment) Regulations 1991 SI 1991/199
Financial Services Act 1986 (Delegation) Order 1991 SI 1991/200

201-300
Copyright Tribunal (Amendment) Rules 1991 SI 1991/201
Public Telecommunication System Designation (Cable Communications (St Helens and Knowsley) Limited) Order 1991 SI 1991/202
Public Telecommunication System Designation (Cablevision North Bedfordshire Limited) Order 1991 SI 1991/203
Isles of Scilly (Functions) Order 1991 SI 1991/205
Price Marking (Petrol) (Amendment) Order 1991 SI 1991/206
Offshore Installations (Safety Zones) Order 1991 SI 1991/207
Avon and Somerset Police (Amalgamation) (Amendment) Order 1991 SI 1991/209
Valuation and Community Charge Tribunals (Amendment) (Allowances) Regulations 1991 SI 1991/210
Personal Community Charge (Relief) (Wales) Regulations 1991 SI 1991/212
Drivers' Hours (Passenger and Goods Vehicles) (Exemption) Regulations 1991 SI 1991/213
Community Drivers' Hours (Passenger and Goods Vehicles) (Temporary Exception) Regulations 1991 SI 1991/214
Upper Spey and Associated Waters Protection (Renewal) Order 1991 SI 1991/215
Community Charges (Information Concerning Social Security) Amendment Regulations 1991 SI 1991/223
Community Charges (Information Concerning Social Security) (Scotland) Amendment Regulations 1991 SI 1991/224
Kent County Council (Dartford Creek Bridge) Scheme 1990 Confirmation Instrument 1991 SI 1991/225
Health Education Authority (Establishment and Constitution) Amendment Order 1991 SI 1991/226
Race Relations Code of Practice (Rented Housing) Order 1991 SI 1991/227
Non-Domestic Rating (Collection and Enforcement) (Local Lists) (Amendment and Miscellaneous Provision) (Amendment) Regulations 1991 SI 1991/228
Public Telecommunication System Designation (Cablevision (Scotland) plc) (Edinburgh) Order 1991 SI 1991/229
Personal Community Charge (Reductions) (England) Regulations 1991 SI 1991/230
Local Government Act 1988 (Defined Activities) (Competition) (Wales) Regulations 1991 SI 1991/232
Assured and Protected Tenancies (Lettings to Students) (Amendment) Regulations 1991 SI 1991/233
Community Charge Benefits (General) Amendment Regulations 1991 SI 1991/234
Housing Benefit (General) Amendment Regulations 1991 SI 1991/235
Income Support (General) Amendment Regulations 1991 SI 1991/236
Sealink (Transfer of Folkestone Harbour) Harbour Revision Order 1991 SI 1991/237
Whitehaven Harbour Revision Order 1991 SI 1991/238
Plant Health (Great Britain) (Amendment) Order 1991 SI 1991/240
Local Government Finance (Miscellaneous Provisions) (England) Order 1991 SI 1991/241
Community Charges and Non-Domestic Rating(Miscellaneous Provisions) (England) Regulations 1991 SI 1991/242
Local Government (Direct Labour Organisations) (Competition) (Scotland) Amendment Regulations 1991 SI 1991/243
Housing Support Grant (Scotland) Order 1991 SI 1991/244
Housing Support Grant (Scotland) Variation Order 1991 SI 1991/245
Social Fund Cold Weather Payments (General) Amendment Regulations 1991 SI 1991/251
Goods Vehicles (Plating and Testing) (Amendment) (No.1) Regulations 1991 SI 1991/252
Motor Vehicles (Tests) (Amendment) (No. 1) Regulations 1991 SI 1991/253
Fire Precautions (Sub-surface Railway Stations) (Amendment) Regulations 1991 SI 1991/259
Statutory Sick Pay Act 1991 (Commencement) Order 1991 SI 1991/260
Local Government Act 1988 (Defined Activities) (Exemption) (Wales) Order 1991 SI 1991/262
Industrial Training (Offshore Petroleum Board) (Revocation) Order 1991 SI 1991/263
Berkshire, Buckinghamshire, Hampshire, Oxfordshire and Surrey (County Boundaries) Order 1991 SI 1991/264
Avon and Gloucestershire (County Boundaries) Order 1991 SI 1991/271
Act of Sederunt (Rules of the Court of Session Amendment No. 1) (Fees of Solicitors) 1991 SI 1991/272
Gaming Act (Variation of Fees) (Scotland) Order 1991 SI 1991/273
Lyon Court and Office Fees (Variation) Order 1991 SI 1991/274
Community Health Councils (Amendment) Regulations 1991 SI 1991/275
Building Societies (General Charge and Fees) Regulations 1991 SI 1991/277
Valuation for Rating (Former Enterprise Zones) Regulations 1991 SI 1991/278
Public Telecommunication System Designation (Cablevision Communications Company of Hertfordshire Limited) (East Hertfordshire) Order 1991 SI 1991/279
Gloucestershire (District Boundaries) Order 1991 SI 1991/281
Bedfordshire, Buckinghamshire and Cambridgeshire (County Boundaries) Order 1991 SI 1991/282
Scottish Enterprise and Highlands and Islands Enterprise (Transfer of Property, Rights and Liabilities) Order 1991 SI 1991/283
Hereford and Worcester and Shropshire (County Boundaries) Order 1991 SI 1991/284
North Yorkshire, South Yorkshire and Nottinghamshire (County Boundaries) Order 1991 SI 1991/285
Dorset and Somerset (County Boundaries) Order 1991 SI 1991/286
Durham and North Yorkshire (County Boundaries) Order 1991 SI 1991/287
Traffic Areas (Reorganisation) Order 1990 S.I. 1991/28 SI 1991/288
Fresh Meat Export (Hygiene and Inspection) (Scotland) Amendment Regulations 1991 SI 1991/289
Act of Sederunt (Fees of Sheriff Officers) 1991 SI 1991/290
Act of Sederunt (Fees of Messengers-at-Arms) 1991 1991/29 SI 1991/291
Public Telecommunication System Designation (Heartland Cablevision (UK) Limited) (Warwick & Stratford-on Avon) Order 1991 SI 1991/293
Public Telecommunication System Designation (Heartland Cablevision II (UK) Limited) (Rugby) Order 1991 SI 1991/294
Public Telecommunication System Designation (Jones Cable Group of Leeds Limited) Order 1991 SI 1991/295
Public Telecommunication System Designation (Telecable of Calderdale Limited) Order 1991 SI 1991/296
Public Telecommunication System Designation (Telecable of Macclesfield Limited) Order 1991 SI 1991/297
Public Telecommunication System Designation (Telecable of Stockport Limited) Order 1991 SI 1991/298
Drivers' Hours (Passenger and Goods Vehicles) (Exemption) (Revocation) Regulations 1991 SI 1991/299
Community Drivers' Hours (Passenger and Goods Vehicles)(Temporary Exception) (Revocation) Regulations 1991 SI 1991/300

301-400
 The Cheltenham, Cotswold and Gloucester (Parishes) Order 1991 S.I. 1991/301
 The Chorley (Parishes) Order 1991 S.I. 1991/302
 The Newbury (Parishes) Order 1991 S.I. 1991/303
 The Northampton (Parishes) Order 1991 S.I. 1991/304
 The Wansdyke (Parishes) Order 1991 S.I. 1991/305
 The West Wiltshire (Parishes) Order 1991 S.I. 1991/306
Social Security (Invalid Care Allowance) Amendment Regulations 1991 SI 1991/307
Offshore Installations (Well Control) (Amendment) Regulations 1991 SI 1991/308
Derbyshire, Leicestershire, Lincolnshire, Nottinghamshire and Warwickshire (County Boundaries) Order 1991 SI 1991/309
Buckinghamshire, Hertfordshire, Northamptonshire and Oxfordshire (County Boundaries) Order 1991 SI 1991/310
Cheshire, Derbyshire, Hereford and Worcester and Staffordshire (County Boundaries) Order 1991 SI 1991/311
Local Government Act 1988 (Defined Activities) (Exemption) (England) Order 1991 SI 1991/312
Revenue Support Grant (Scotland) Order 1991 SI 1991/323
Control of Pollution (Silage, Slurry and Agricultural Fuel Oil) Regulations 1991 SI 1991/324
National Health Service (District Health Authorities) Order 1991 SI 1991/325
National Health Service (Determination of Districts) Order 1991 SI 1991/326
National Health Service Training Authority (Abolition) Order 1991 SI 1991/327
National Health Service Training Authority and Disablement Services Authority Regulations 1991 SI 1991/328
Regional and District Health Authorities (Membership and Procedure) Amendment Regulations 1991 SI 1991/329
Law Reform (Miscellaneous Provisions) (Scotland) Act 1990 (Commencement No. 3) Order 1991 SI 1991/330
High Court of Justiciary Fees Amendment Order SI 1991/331
Court of Session etc. Fees Amendment Order 1991 SI 1991/332
Sheriff Court Fees Amendment Order 1991 SI 1991/333
Industrial Training (Plastics Processing Board) (Revocation) Order 1991 SI 1991/334
Sea Fishing (Days in Port) (Amendment) Regulations 1991 SI 1991/335
Removal, Storage and Disposal of Vehicles (Prescribed Sums and Charges etc.) (Amendment) Regulations 1991 SI 1991/336
Highway Litter Clearance and Cleaning (Transfer of Duties) Order 1991 SI 1991/337
Vehicles (Charges for Release from Immobilisation Devices) Regulations 1991 SI 1991/338
Misuse of Drugs (Licence Fees) (Amendment) Regulations 1991 SI 1991/339
Stock Transfer (Specified Securities) Order 1991 SI 1991/340
Fire Services (Appointments and Promotion) (Scotland) Amendment Regulations 1991 SI 1991/343
Local Government and Housing Act 1989 (Commencement No.11 and Savings) Order 1991 SI 1991/344
Health Education Board for Scotland (Transfer of Officers) Regulations 1991 SI 1991/345
Control of Pollution (Silage, Slurry and Agricultural Fuel Oil) (Scotland) Regulations 1991 SI 1991/346
General Lighthouse Authorities (Beacons: Hyperbolic Systems) Order 1991 SI 1991/347
Finance Act 1985 (Interest on Tax) (Prescribed Rate) Order 1991 SI 1991/348
Local Authorities (Members' Allowances) Regulations 1991 SI 1991/351
Personal Community Charge (Reductions) (England) (Amendment) Regulations 1991 SI 1991/352
Education (Grant-maintained Schools) (Finance) Regulations 1991 SI 1991/353
Attachment of Earnings (Employer's Deduction) Order 1991 SI 1991/356
Building Societies (Designation of Qualifying Bodies) Order 1991. SI 1991/357
National Health Service Trusts (Consultation before Establishment) (Scotland) Regulations 1991 SI 1991/358
Islwyn (Pontllanfraith and Blackwood Communities) Order 1991 SI 1991/366
Wildlife and Countryside Act 1981 (Variation of Schedule) Order 1991 SI 1991/367
Eastbourne, Newcastle and Gateshead and North Surrey (Pipelaying and Other Works)(Codes of Practice) Order 1991 SI 1991/368
Fire Services (Appointments and Promotion) (Amendment) Regulation 1991 SI 1991/369
Imported Food (Peruvian Foodstuffs) Regulations 1991 SI 1991/370
Value Added Tax (Refunds for Bad Depts) Regulations 1991 SI 1991/371
Public Telecommunication System Designation (Britannia Cablesystems Wirral Limited) Order 1991 SI 1991/372
Public Telecommunication System Designation (Newport Cablevision) Order 1991 SI 1991/373
Public Telecommunication System Designation (Tayside Cable Systems Limited) (Dundee) Order 1991 SI 1991/374
Oxfordshire (District Boundaries) Order 1991 SI 1991/379
Insolvency (Amendment) Regulations 1991 SI 1991/380
Passenger and Goods Vehicles (Recording Equipment) Regulations 1991 SI 1991/381
Local Government (Non-Domestic District Rates and District Community Charges) (Scotland) Amendment Regulation 1991 SI 1991/382
Education (Listed Bodies) Order 1991 SI 1991/383
Education (Recognised Bodies) (Amendment) Order 1991 SI 1991/384
Local Authority Stocks and Bonds (Scotland) Amendment Regulations 1991 SI 1991/385
 The Oxford (Parishes) Order 1991 S.I. 1991/386
Enterprise (Scotland) Consequential Amendments Order 1991 SI 1991/387
National Health Service and Community Care Act 1990 (Commencement No. 7) Order 1991 SI 1991/388
Disablement Services Authority (Consequential Provisions) Order 1991 SI 1991/389
Hill Livestock (Compensatory Allowances) (Amendment) Regulations 1991 SI 1991/392
Sugar Beet (Research and Education) Order 1991 SI 1991/393
Local Authorities Etc. (Allowance) (Scotland) Regulations 1991 SI 1991/397
Central and Tayside Regions and Clackmannan and Perth and Kinross Districts (Crook of Devon and Rumbling Bridge) Boundaries Amendment Order 1991 SI 1991/398 (S. 40)

401-500
Diseases of Animals (Approved Disinfectants) (Amendment) Order 1991 SI 1991/404
Poultry Flocks, Hatcheries and Processed Animal Protein (Fees) (Amendment) Order 1991 SI 1991/405
National Health Service (Vocational Training) Amendment Regulations 1991 SI 1991/406
United Kingdom Transplant Support Service Authority (Establishment and Constitution) Order 1991 SI 1991/407
United Kingdom Transplant Support Service Authority Regulations 1991 SI 1991/408
Education Reform Act 1988 (Commencement No. 9) Order 1991 SI 1991/409
Education (Variation of Standard Numbers for Primary Schools) Order 1991 SI 1991/410
Education (Publication of Proposals for Reduction in Standard Number) Regulations 1991 SI 1991/411
Petty Sessional Divisions (Powys) Order 1991 SI 1991/412
Sea Fish Industry Authority (Levy) (Amendment) Regulations 1990 Confirmatory Order 1991 SI 1991/417
Public Telecommunication System Designation (Cheshire Cable Limited) Order 1991 SI 1991/422
Public Airport Companies (Capital Finance) (Amendment) Order 1991 SI 1991/423
International Carriage of Perishable Foodstuffs (Amendment) Regulations 1991 SI 1991/425
Rent Officers (Additional Functions) (Amendment) Order 1991 SI 1991/426
Guaranteed Minimum Pensions Increase Order 1991 SI 1991/427
Statutory Sick Pay (Small Employers' Relief) Regulations 1991 SI 1991/428
State Scheme Premiums (Actuarial Tables) Amendment Regulations 1991 SI 1991/429
Community Charges and Non-Domestic Rating (Demand Notices) (Wales) (Amendment) (No.2) Regulations 1991 SI 1991/434
Income Tax (Employments) (No. 20) Regulations 1991 SI 1991/435
Wireless Telegraphy (Television Licence Fees) Regulations 1991 SI 1991/436
National Assistance (Charges for Accommodation) Amendment Regulations 1991 SI 1991/437
National Health Service (Charges to Overseas Visitors) Amendment Regulations 1991 SI 1991/438
Local Government Reorganisation (Capital Money) (Greater London) Order 1991 SI 1991/439
Housing Benefit and Community Charge Benefit (Subsidy) Regulations 1991 SI 1991/441
Common Council and New Successor Bodies (Chief Finance Officer) Regulations 1991 SI 1991/445
Isles of Scilly (Members' Allowances) Order 1991 SI 1991/446
Cosmetic Products (Safety) (Amendment) Regulations 1991 SI 1991/447
Public Telecommunications System Designation (East London Telecommunications Limited) (Havering) Order 1991 SI 1991/448
Education (Special Educational Needs) (Approval of Independment Schools) Regulation 1991 SI 1991/449
Education (Approval of Special Schools) (Amendment) Regulations 1991 SI 1991/450
Goods Vehicles (Plating and Testing) (Amendment) (No. 2) Regulations 1991 SI 1991/454
Motor Vehicles (Tests) (Amendment) (No. 2) Regulations 1991 SI 1991/455
Public Service Vehicles (Conditions of Fitness, Equipment, Use and Certification) (Amendment) Regulations 1991 SI 1991/456
Passenger and Goods Vehicles (Recording Equipment) (Approval of Fitters and Workshops) (Fees) (Amendment) Regulations 1991 SI 1991/457
International Carriage of Dangerous Goods by Road (Fees) (Amendment) Regulations 1991 SI 1991/458
International Transport of Goods under Cover of TIR Carnets (Fees) (Amendments) Regulations 1991 SI 1991/459
Abortion (Scotland) Regulations 1991 SI 1991/460
North West (Pipelaying and Other Works) (Code of Practice) Order 1991 SI 1991/461
International Development Association (Ninth Replenishment) Order 1991 SI 1991/462
Employment Protection (Variation of Limits) Order 1991 SI 1991/464
Industrial Training Levy (Construction Board) Order 1991 SI 1991/465
Unfair Dismissal (Increase of Compensation Limit) Order 1991 SI 1991/466
Unfair Dismissal (Increase of Limits of Basic and Special Awards) Order 1991 SI 1991/467
Civil Aviation (Navigation Services Charges) Regulations 1991 SI 1991/470
Non-Domestic Rating (Caravan Sites) (Amendment) Regulations 1991 SI 1991/471
Environmental Protection (Prescribed Processes and Substances) Regulations 1991 SI 1991/472
Local Government (Promotion of Economic Development) (Amendment) Regulations 1991 SI 1991/473
Standard Community Charge and Non-Domestic Rating (Definition of Domestic Property) (Amendment) Order 1991 SI 1991/474
Non-Domestic Rating (Electricity Generators) Regulations 1991 SI 1991/475
Litter (Relevant Land of Principal Litter Authorities and Relevant Crown Land) Order 1991 SI 1991/476
Radioactive Substances (Smoke Detectors) Exemption (Amendment) Order 1991 SI 1991/477
Wildlife and Countryside (Registration and Ringing of Certain Captive Birds) (Amendment) Regulations 1991 SI 1991/478
Wildlife and Countryside (Registration to Sell etc. Certain Dead Wild Birds) (Amendment) Regulations 1991 SI 1991/479
Human Fertilisation and Embryology Act 1990 (Commencement No. 2 and Transitional Provision) Order 1991 SI 1991/480
National Health Service (Remuneration and Conditions of Service) Regulations 1991 SI 1991/481
National Health Service Trusts (Public Meetings) Regulations 1991 SI 1991/482
Public Telecommunication System Designation (Wakefield Cable Limited) Order 1991 SI 1991/483
Certification Officer (Amendment of Fees) Regulations 1991 SI 1991/484
Motor Vehicles (Driving Licenses) (Amendment) Regulations 1991 SI 1991/485
Driving Licences (Community Driving Licence) (Amendment) Regulations 1991 SI 1991/486
Merchant Shipping (Light Dues) (Amendment) Regulations 1991 SI 1991/487
Companies Act 1989 (Commencement No. 9 and Saving and Transitional Provisions) Order 1991 SI 1991/488
Financial Services Act 1986 (Restriction of Right of Action) Regulations 1991 SI 1991/489
London Residuary Body (Transfer of Compensation Functions) Order 1991 SI 1991/490
A1 London-Edinburgh-Thurso Trunk Road (North Shotton Slip Road) Order 1991 SI 1991/491
Financial Services Act 1986 (Miscellaneous Exemptions) Order 1991 SI 1991/493
Bankruptcy and Companies (Department of Trade and Industry) Fees (Amendment) Order 1991 SI 1991/494
Insolvency (Amendment) Rules 1991 SI 1991/495
Insolvency Fees (Amendment) Order 1991 SI 1991/496
Education (London Residuary Body) (Property Transfer) Order 1991 SI 1991/497
Food Protection (Emergency Prohibitions) (Lead in Cattle) (England) Order 1991 SI 1991/498
Abortion Regulations 1991 SI 1991/499
Local Authorities (Capital Finance) (Amendment) Regulations 1991 SI 1991/500

501-600
Local Authorities (Capital Finance) (Approved Investments) (Amendment) Regulations 1991 SI 1991/501
Child Benefit and Social Security (Fixing and Adjustment of Rates) Amendment Regulations 1991 SI 1991/502
Social Security Benefits Up-rating Order 1991 SI 1991/503
Social Security (Contributions) Amendment Regulations 1991 SI 1991/504
Social Security (Contributions) (Re-rating) Order 1991 SI 1991/505
Statutory Sick Pay (Rate of Payment) Order 1991 SI 1991/506
Environmental Protection (Applications, Appeals and Registers) Regulations 1991 SI 1991/507
Disposal of Controlled Waste (Exceptions) Regulations 1991 SI 1991/508
National Health Service Trusts (Pharmaceutical Services Remuneration—Special Arrangement) Order 1991 SI 1991/509
National Bus Company (Dissolution) Order 1991 SI 1991/510
Income Tax (Building Societies) (Annual Payments) Regulations 1991 SI 1991/512
Environmental Protection (Authorisation of Processes) (Determination Periods) Order 1991 SI 1991/513
Leicester-Great Yarmouth Trunk Road (A47) (Narborough Bypass) Detrunking Order 1991 SI 1991/514
Motor Vehicles (Driving Licences) (Large Goods and Passenger-Carrying Vehicles) (Amendment) Regulations 1991 SI 1991/515
Merseyside Traffic Control System (Revocation) Order 1991 SI 1991/516
West Yorkshire Residuary Body (Winding Up) Order 1991 SI 1991/517
Capital Allowances (Corresponding Northern Ireland Grants) Order 1991 SI 1991/518
Friendly Societies (Fees) Regulations 1991 SI 1991/519
Industrial and Provident Societies (Amendment of Fees) Regulations 1991 SI 1991/520
Industrial and Provident Societies (Credit Unions) (Amendment of Fees) Regulations 1991 SI 1991/521
Third Country Fishing (Enforcement) Order 1991 SI 1991/522
Internal Drainage Boards (Finance) (Amendment) Regulations 1991 SI 1991/523
Civil Legal Aid (General) (Amendment) Regulations 1991 SI 1991/524
County Court (Amendment) Rules 1991 SI 1991/525
County Court (Forms) (Amendment) Rules 1991 SI 1991/526
Legal Advice and Assistance at Police Stations (Remuneration) (Amendment) Regulations 1991 SI 1991/527
Legal Advice and Assistance (Duty Solicitor) (Remuneration) (Amendment) Regulations 1991 SI 1991/528
Legal Aid in Criminal and Care Proceedings (Costs) (Amendment) Regulations 1991 SI 1991/529
Matrimonial Causes (Costs) (Amendment) Rules 1991 SI 1991/530
Rules of the Supreme Court (Amendment) 1991 SI 1991/531
Value Added Tax (Annual Accounting) (Amendment) Regulations 1991 SI 1991/532
Rent Officers (Additional Functions) (Scotland) Amendment Order 1991 SI 1991/533
National Health Service (Optical Charges and Payments) (Miscellaneous Amendments) (Scotland) Regulations 1991 SI 1991/534
National Health Service Trusts (Membership and Procedure) (Scotland) Regulations 1991 SI 1991/535
Social Work (Provision of Social Work Services in the Scottish Health Service) (Scotland) Regulations 1991 SI 1991/536
National Health Service (Remuneration and Conditions of Service) (Scotland) Regulations 1991 SI 1991/537
Financial Services Act 1986 (Restriction of Right of Action) (Friendly Societies) Regulations 1991 SI 1991/538
Industrial Assurance (Fees) Regulations 1991 SI 1991/539
Sealink (Transfer of Lymington Pier) Harbour Revision Order 1991 SI 1991/540
Wireless Telegraphy (Licence Charges) Regulations 1991 SI 1991/542
Child Benefit (Different Rates) Order 1991 SI 1991/543
Income Support (General) Amendment No. 2 Regulations 1991 SI 1991/544
Social Security Benefits Up-rating Regulations 1991 SI 1991/545
Social Security (Industrial Injuries) (Dependency) (Permitted Earnings Limits) Order 1991 SI 1991/546
Social Security (Overlapping Benefits) Amendment Regulations 1991 SI 1991/547
Lee Valley Regional Park Authority (Capital Finance) Regulations 1991 SI 1991/548
Prevention of Terrorism (Temporary Provisions) Act 1989 (Continuance) Order 1991 SI 1991/549
Education (Thames Valley College of Higher Education Corporation) (Dissolution) Order 1991 SI 1991/550
Local Authorities (Borrowing) (Amendment) Regulations 1991 SI 1991/551
Isles of Scilly (Community Care) Order 1991 SI 1991/552
National Health Service (Appellate Functions) (Directions to Authorities) Regulations 1991 SI 1991/553
National Health Service Functions (Directions to Authorities and Administration Arrangements) Regulations 1991 SI 1991/554
National Health Service (General Medical and Pharmaceutical Services) (Miscellaneous Amendments) Regulations 1991 SI 1991/555
National Health Service (Indicative Amounts) Regulations 1991 SI 1991/556
National Health Service (Travelling Expenses and Remission of Charges) Amendment Regulations 1991 SI 1991/557
Social Security Act 1990 (Commencement No. 3) Order 1991 SI 1991/558
Education (Inner London Education Authority) (Tranisitional and Supplementary Provisions) Order 1991 SI 1991/559
Litter (Designated Educational Institutions) Order 1991 SI 1991/561
Large Combustion Plant (Control of Emissions) (Scotland) Regulations 1991 SI 1991/562
Radioactive Substances (Smoke Detectors) Exemption (Scotland) Amendment Order 1991 SI 1991/563
Common Services Agency (Membership and Procedure) Regulations 1991 SI 1991/564
Civil Legal Aid (Scotland)(Fees) Amendment Regulations 1991 SI 1991/565
Criminal Legal Aid (Scotland) (Fees) Amendment Regulations 1991 SI 1991/566
Advice and Assistance (Scotland) Amendment Regulations 1991 SI 1991/567
Legal Aid (Scotland) (Fees in Civil Proceedings) Amendment Regulations 1991 SI 1991/568
National Health Service (Dental Services) (Miscellaneous Amendments) (Scotland) Regulations 1991 SI 1991/569
Functions of Health Boards (Scotland) Order 1991 SI 1991/570
National Health Service (General Medical and Pharmaceutical Services) (Scotland) Amendment Regulations 1991 SI 1991/572
National Health Service (Fund-Holding Practices) (General) (Scotland) Regulations 1991 SI 1991/573
National Health Service (Charges for Drugs and Appliances) (Scotland) Amendment Regulations 1991 SI 1991/574
National Health Service (Travelling Expenses and Remission of Charges) (Scotland) Amendment Regulations 1991 SI 1991/575
National Health Service (Vocational Training) (Scotland) Amendment Regulations 1991 SI 1991/576
Channel Tunnel (Emergency Medical Services) Order 1991 SI 1991/577
Clinical Standards Advisory Group Regulations 1991 SI 1991/578
National Health Service (Charges for Drugs and Appliances) Amendment Regulations 1991 SI 1991/579
National Health Service (Dentists' Remuneration-Special Arrangement) Order 1991 SI 1991/580
National Health Service (Dental Services) (Miscellaneous Amendments) Regulations 1991 SI 1991/581
National Health Service (Fund-holding Practices) (General) Regulations 1991 SI 1991/582
National Health Service (Optical Charges and Payments) (Miscellaneous Amendments) Regulations 1991 SI 1991/583
National Health Service Superannuation, Premature Retirement and Injury Benefits (Amendment) Regulations 1991 SI 1991/584
Welfare Food Amendment Regulations 1991 SI 1991/585
Petty Sessional Divisions (Wiltshire) Order 1991 SI 1991/586
Housing Benefit and Community Charge Benefit (Subsidy) Order 1991 SI 1991/587
Personal and Occupational Pension Schemes (Pensions Ombudsman) Regulations 1991 SI 1991/588
Statutory Sick Pay (National Health Service Employees) Regulations 1991 SI 1991/589
Statutory Maternity Pay (National Health Service Employees) Regulations 1991 SI 1991/590

601-700
Grants to Voluntary Organisations (Greater London) (Expenditure Limit) Order 1991 SI 1991/606
National Health Service and Community Care Act 1990 (Commencement No. 8 and Transitional Provisions) (Scotland) Order 1991 SI 1991/607
Courts and Legal Services Act 1990 (Commencement No. 3) Order 1991 SI 1991/608
Parliamentary Pensions (Amendment) Regulations 1991 SI 1991/609
Public Telecommunication System Designation (Wessex Cable Limited) (Salisbury) Order 1991 SI 1991/610
Income Tax (Interest Relief) (Qualifying Lenders) Order 1991 SI 1991/618
Housing (Right to Buy) (Priority of Charges) Order 1991 SI 1991/619
Insurance (Fees) Regulations 1991 SI 1991/621
A39 Trunk Road (Wadebridge Bypass) Order 1991 SI 1991/628
Control of Gold, Securities, Payments and Credits (Kuwait) (Revocation) Directions 1991 SI 1991/629
A39 Trunk Road (Wadebridge Bypass) (Detrunking) Order 1991 SI 1991/630
Disease of Animals (Approved Disinfectants) (Amendment) (No. 2) Order 1991 SI 1991/631
Medicines (Fees Relating to Medicinal Products for Animal Use) Regulations 1991 SI 1991/632
Medicines (Exemptions from Licences and Animal Test Certificates) (Amendment) Order 1991 SI 1991/633
Traffic Areas (Reorganisation) Order 1991 SI 1991/634
Civil Legal Aid (Assessment of Resources) (Amendment) Regulations 1991 SI 1991/635
Legal Advice and Assistance (Amendment) Regulations 1991 SI 1991/636
Legal Aid in Criminal and Care Proceedings (General) (Amendment) Regulations 1991 SI 1991/637
Merchant Shipping (Distress Signals and Prevention of Collisions) (Amendment) Regulations 1991 SI 1991/638
Social Security (Contributions) Amendment (No. 2) Regulations 1991 SI 1991/639
Social Security (Contributions) Amendment (No. 3) Regulations 1991 SI 1991/640
Statutory Maternity Pay (Compensation of Employers) Amendment Regulations 1991 SI 1991/641
 The Wealden (Parishes) Order 1991 S.I. 1991/644
Non-Domestic Rates (Levying) (Scotland) Regulations 1991 SI 1991/645
Electricity Generators (Rateable Values) (Scotland) Order 1991 SI 1991/646
Scottish Hydro-Electric plc (Rateable Values) (Scotland) Order 1991 SI 1991/647
Scottish Nuclear Limited (Rateable Values) (Scotland) Order 1991 SI 1991/648
Scottish Power plc (Rateable Values) (Scotland) Order 1991 SI 1991/649
Offshore Installations (Safety Zones) (No. 2)Order 1991 SI 1991/650
Plant Breeders' Rights (Fees) (Amendment) Regulations 1991 SI 1991/655
Seeds (Fees) (Amendment) Regulations 1991 SI 1991/656
Seeds (National Lists of Varieties) (Fees) (Amendment) Regulations 1991 SI 1991/657
Lands Tribunal for Scotland (Amendment) (Fees) Rules 1991 SI 1991/658
Scottish Land Court (Fees) Order 1991 SI 1991/659
Buckinghamshire County Council Campbell Park to Newlands (Canal Bridge) Scheme 1990 Confirmation Instrument 1991 SI 1991/661
Patent Office (Address) Rules 1991 SI 1991/675
Public Telecommunication System Designation (Middlesex Cable Limited) (Hillingdon and Hounslow) Order 1991 SI 1991/676
Education (National Curriculum) (Attainment Targets and Programmes of Study in Geography) (England) Order 1991 SI 1991/678
Offshore Installations (Amendment) Regulations 1991 SI 1991/679
Submarine Pipe-lines (Inspectors and Safety) (Amendment) Regulations 1991 SI 1991/680
Education (National Curriculum) (Attainment Targets and Programmes of Study in History) (England) Order 1991 SI 1991/681
Financial Assistance for Environmental Purposes Order 1991 SI 1991/682
Pensions Increase (Review) Order 1991 SI 1991/684
Environmental Protection Act 1990 (Commencement No. 6 and Appointed Day) Order 1991 SI 1991/685
National Assistance (Charges for Accommodation) (Scotland) Regulations 1991 SI 1991/686
Public Telecommunication System Designation (Jones Cable Group of Aylesbury and Chiltern Limited) Order 1991 SI 1991/687
Public Telecommunication System Designation (Tayside Cable Systems Ltd) (Perth) Order 1991 SI 1991/688
Value Added Tax (General) (Amendment) Regulations 1991 SI 1991/691
Statutory Sick Pay Act 1991 (Consequential) Regulations 1991 SI 1991/694
District of Welwyn Hatfield (Electoral Arrangements) Order 1991  SI 1991/695
(A696) Ponteland Road Roundabout (Trunking) Order 1991 SI 1991/696
(A6125) North Brunton Roundabout (Trunking) Order 1991 SI 1991/697

701-800
Building Societies (Deferred Shares) Order 1991 SI 1991/701
Building Societies (Designated Capital Resources) (Permanent Interest Bearing Shares) Order 1991 SI 1991/702
Food Protection (Emergency Prohibitions) (Lead in Cattle) (England) (Revocation) (No. 2) Order 1991 SI 1991/703
Social Security (Mobility Allowance and Adjudication) Amendment Regulations 1991 SI 1991/706
Contracts (Applicable Law) Act 1990 (Commencement No. 1) Order 1991 SI 1991/707
Personal Injuries (Civilians) Amendment Scheme 1991 SI 1991/708
Public Telecommunication System Designation (Britannia Cablesystems Teesside Limited) Order 1991 SI 1991/709
West Midlands Residuary Body (Winding Up) Order 1991 SI 1991/710
A6119 and A677 Leeds-Halifax-Burnley-Blackburn-East of Preston Trunk Road (Whitebirk to Samlesbury) (Detrunking) Order 1991 SI 1991/716
Caribbean Development Bank (Further Payments) Order 1991 SI 1991/717
Workmen's Compensation (Supplementation) Amendment Scheme 1991 SI 1991/718
Litter Etc. (Transitional Provisions) Regulations 1991 SI 1991/719
Borough of Langbaurgh (Electoral Arrangements) Order 1991 SI 1991/720
M65 Motorway (Bamber Bridge to Whitebirk Section, Blackburn Southern Bypass) and Connecting Roads Scheme 1991 SI 1991/722
Non-Domestic Rating (Alteration of Central Lists) (Amendment) Regulations 1991 SI 1991/723
High Court and County Courts Jurisdiction Order 1991 SI 1991/724
National Health Service Contracts (Dispute Resolution) Regulations 1991 SI 1991/725
Income Tax (Indexation) Order 1991 SI 1991/732
Personal Equity Plan (Amendment) Regulations 1991 SI 1991/733
Retirement Benefits Schemes (Indexation of Earnings Cap) Order 1991 SI 1991/734
Inheritance Tax (Indexation) Order 1991 SI 1991/735
Capital Gains Tax (Annual Exempt Amount) Order 1991 SI 1991/736
Value Added Tax (Charities) Order 1991 SI 1991/737
Value Added Tax (Increase of Registration Limits) Order 1991 SI 1991/738
Personal Community Charge (Hospital Patients) Order 1991 SI 1991/739
Civil Legal Aid (Scotland) Amendment Regulations 1991 SI 1991/745
Advice and Assistance (Scotland) (Prospective Cost) Amendment Regulations 1991 SI 1991/746
Merger Situation (Stora/Swedish Match/Gillette) (Interim Provision) Order 1991 SI 1991/750
Education (National Curriculum) (Attainment Targets and Programmes of Study in Geography) (Wales) Order 1991 SI 1991/751
Education (National Curriculum) (Attainment Targets and Programmes of Study in History) (Wales) Order 1991 SI 1991/752
A16 Trunk Road (Spalding to Sutterton Improvement) Order 1991 SI 1991/753
A16 Trunk Road (Spalding to Sutterton Improvement) (Detrunking) Order 1991 SI 1991/754
European Communities (Designation) (No. 2) Order 1991 SI 1991/755
Antarctic Treaty (Specially Protected Areas) Order 1991 SI 1991/756
European Bank for Reconstruction and Development (Immunities and Privileges) Order 1991 SI 1991/757
European Communities (Definition of Treaties) (Fourth ACP-EEC Convention of Lome) Order 1991 SI 1991/758
Appropriation (Northern Ireland) Order 1991 SI 1991/759
Census (Confidentiality) (Northern Ireland) Order 1991 SI 1991/760
Financial Provisions(Northern Ireland) Order 1991 SI 1991/761
Food Safety(Northern Ireland) Order 1991 SI 1991/762
Merchant Shipping (Distress Signals and Prevention of Collisions) (Guernsey) (Amendment) Order 1991 SI 1991/763
Repayment of Fees and Charges(Northern Ireland) Order 1991 SI 1991/764
Statutory Sick Pay (Northern Ireland) Order 1991 SI 1991/765
Naval, Military and Air Forces etc. (Disablement and Death) Service Pensions Amendment Order 1991 SI 1991/766
Social Security (Norway) Order 1991 SI 1991/767
Collision Regulations (Seaplanes) (Amendment) Order 1991 SI 1991/768
Collision Regulations (Seapanes) (Guernsey) (Amendment) Order 1991 SI 1991/769
Merchant Shipping (Categorisation of Registries of Overseas Territories) Order 1991 SI 1991/770
Motor Vehicles (International Circulation) (Amendment) Order 1991 SI 1991/771
Lords Office-holders Allowance Order 1991 SI 1991/772
Vehicle Inspectorate Trading Fund Order 1991 SI 1991/773
Agricultural, Fishery and Aquaculture Products (Improvement Grant) Regulations 1991 SI 1991/777
Public Telecommunication System Designation (Diamond Cable (Mansfield) Limited) Order 1991 SI 1991/778
Northern Ireland (Emergency and Prevention of Terrorism Provisions) (Continuance) Order 1991 SI 1991/779
Highlands and Islands Rural Enterprise Programme Regulations 1991 SI 1991/780
Merchant Shipping (Fees) Regulations 1991 SI 1991/784
Supply of Razors and Razor Blades (Interim Provision) Order 1991 SI 1991/785
Pensions Increase (Judicial Pensions)(Amendment) Regulations 1991 SI 1991/786
Pensions Increase (Past Prime Ministers) Regulations 1991 SI 1991/787
Pensions Increase (Speakers' Pensions) (Amendment) Regulations 1991 SI 1991/788
Costs in Criminal Cases (General) (Amendment) Regulations 1991 SI 1991/789
Legal Aid Act 1988 (Commencement No. 4) Order 1991 SI 1991/790
Combined Probation Areas (Powys) Order 1991 SI 1991/791
Gloucestershire Districts (Electoral Arrangements) Order 1991 SI 1991/793
Combined Probation Areas (Wiltshire) Order 1991 SI 1991/794
Census (Amendment) Regulations 1991 SI 1991/796
A17 Trunk Road (Leadenham Bypass) Order 1991 SI 1991/797
A17 Trunk Road (Leadenham Bypass) (Detrunking) Order 1991 SI 1991/798
King's Lynn-Newark Trunk Road (Leadenham By-Pass and Slip Roads) (Revocation) Order 1991 SI 1991/799

801-900
Merseyside Traffic Control System (Revocation) (No. 2) Order SI 1991/808
Health Boards (Membership and Procedure) (No.2) Regulations 1991 SI 1991/809
Appellants (Increase in Expenses) (Scotland) Order 1991 SI 1991/810
Department of Transport (Fees) (Amendment) Order 1991 SI 1991/811
District of South Herefordshire (Electoral Arrangements) Order 1991 SI 1991/816
Consumer Credit (Period of Standard Licence) (Amendment) Regulations 1991 SI 1991/817
Redundancy Payments (Local Government) (Modification) (Amendment) Order 1991 SI 1991/818
Home Purchase Assistance (Price-limits) Order 1991 SI 1991/819
Motor Vehicles (Type Approval) (Amendment) Regulations 1991 SI 1991/820
Act of Sederunt (Amendment of Summary Cause and Small Claim Rules) 1991 SI 1991/821
Law Reform (Miscellaneous Provisions) (Scotland) Act 1990 (Commencement No.4) Order 1991 SI 1991/822
Companies Act 1985 (Mutual Recognition of Prospectuses) Regulations 1991 SI 1991/823
European Communities (Recognition of Professional Qualifications) Regulations 1991 SI 1991/824
Imprisonment and Detention (Air Force) (Amendment) Rules 1991 SI 1991/825
Imprisonment and Detention (Army) (Amendment) Rules 1991 SI 1991/826
Education (Mandatory Awards) (Amendment) Regulations 1991 SI 1991/827
Children Act 1989 (Commencement and Transitional Provisions) Order 1991 SI 1991/828
Education (Student Loans) (Amendment) Regulations 1991 SI 1991/829
Education (Fees and Awards) (Amendment) Regulations 1991 SI 1991/830
State Awards (Amendment) Regulations 1991 SI 1991/831
Dairy Produce Quotas (Amendment) Regulations 1991 SI 1991/832
Education (Fees and Awards, Allowances and Bursaries) (Scotland) Amendment Regulations 1991 SI 1991/834
Personal Community Charge (Relief) (Wales) (Amendment) Regulations 1991 SI 1991/835
Environmental Protection (Amendment of Regulations) Regulations 1991 SI 1991/836
Legal Aid in Contempt Proceedings (Remuneration) Regulations 1991 SI 1991/837
Legal Aid in Criminal and Care Proceedings (Costs) (Amendment) (No.2) Regulations 1991 SI 1991/838
Blood Tests (Evidence of Paternity) (Amendment) (No. 2) Regulations 1991 SI 1991/839
Community Charges (Miscellaneous Provisions) Regulations 1991 SI 1991/841
Community Charges and Non-Domestic Rating (Demand Notices) (England) (Amendment) Regulations 1991 SI 1991/842
Community Charges and Non-Domestic Rating (Demand Notices) (City of London) (Amendment) Regulations 1991 SI 1991/843
Personal Community Charge (Reductions) (England) (Amendment) (No. 2) Regulations 1991 SI 1991/844
Act of Sederunt (Rules of the Court of Session Amendment No.3) (Solicitors' Fees) 1991 SI 1991/846
Act of Adjournal (Consolidation Amendment No.1) 1991 SI 1991/847
Act of Sederunt (Fees of Solicitors in the Sheriff Court) (Amendment) 1991 SI 1991/848
Community Charge Benefits (General) Amendment (No. 2) Regulations 1991 SI 1991/849
Law Reform (Miscellaneous Provisions) (Scotland) Act 1990 (Commencement No. 5) Order 1991 SI 1991/850
Lloyd's Underwriters (Tax) (1988–89) Regulations 1991 SI 1991/851
Electricity Act 1989 (Scottish Power plc) Extinguishment of Loans Order 1991 SI 1991/852
Electricity Act 1989 (Scottish Hydro-Electric plc) Extinguishment of Loans Order 1991 SI 1991/853
Personal Community Charge (Reduction for 1990-91) (Scotland) Regulations 1991 SI 1991/854
Personal Community Charge (Reduction for 1991-92) (Scotland) Regulations 1991 SI 1991/855
Community Charges (Levying, Collection and Payment) (Scotland) Regulations 1991 SI 1991/856
Central Office of Information Trading Fund Order 1991 SI 1991/857
Public Lending Right (Increase of Limit) Order 1991 SI 1991/858
Estate Agents (Provision of Information) Regulations 1991 SI 1991/859
Estate Agents (Specified Offences) Order 1991 SI 1991/860
Estate Agents (Undesirable Practices) Order 1991 SI 1991/861
Superannuation (Children's Pensions) (Earnings Limit) Order 1991 SI 1991/862
Gaming Act (Variation of Monetary Limits) Order 1991 SI 1991/870
Gaming Clubs (Hours and Charges) (Amendment) Regulations 1991 SI 1991/871
Gaming Clubs (Multiple Bingo) (Amendment) Regulations 1991 SI 1991/872
Measuring Instruments (EEC Requirements) (Fees) (Amendment) Regulations 1991 SI 1991/873
Wireless Telegraphy Apparatus (Approval) (Test Fees) Order 1991 SI 1991/874
Buying Agency Trading Fund Order 1991 SI 1991/875
Property Services Agency Supplies Trading Fund Order 1976 (Revocation) Order 1991 SI 1991/876
Community Charges (Demand Notices) (Additional Provisions) (Wales) Regulations 1991 SI 1991/877
Companies Act 1989 (Commencement No. 10 and Saving Provisions) Order 1991 SI 1991/878
Companies (Forms) Regulations 1991 SI 1991/879
Financial Markets and Insolvency Regulations 1991 SI 1991/880
Broadcasting (Channel 3 Transmission and Shared Distribution Costs) Order 1991 SI 1991/881
Taxes (Interest Rate) (Amendment) Regulations 1991 SI 1991/889
Arrangements for Placement of Children (General) Regulations 1991 SI 1991/890
Contact with Children Regulations 1991 SI 1991/891
Definition of Independent Visitors (Children) Regulations 1991 SI 1991/892
Placement of Children with Parents etc. Regulations 1991 SI 1991/893
Representations Procedure (Children) Regulations 1991 SI 1991/894
Review of Children's Cases Regulations 1991 SI 1991/895
Housing Renovation etc. Grants (Reduction of Grant) (Amendment) Regulations 1991 SI 1991/897
Housing Renovation etc. Grants (Prescribed Forms and Particulars) (Amendment) Regulations 1991 SI 1991/898
Pneumoconiosis etc. (Workers' Compensation) (Payment of Claims) (Amendment) Regulations 1991 SI 1991/899
Common Services Agency (Withdrawal and Amendment of Functions) (Scotland) Order 1991 SI 1991/900

901-1000
Foster Placement (Children) Regulations 1991 SI 1991/910
Injuries in War (Shore Employments) Compensation (Amendment) Scheme 1991 SI 1991/911
Scottish Nuclear Limited (Rateable Values) (Scotland) (No.2) Order 1991 SI 1991/914
Caravan Sites and Pitches (Rateable Values) (Scotland) Order 1991 SI 1991/915
Mines and Quarries (Rateable Values) (Scotland) Order 1991 SI 1991/916
Industrial and Freight Transport (Rateable Values) (Scotland) Order 1991 SI 1991/917
A18 Trunk Road (Barnetby Top to East of Ermine Street) (Detrunking) Order 1991 SI 1991/924
North Tyneside Steam Railway Light Railway Order 1991 SI 1991/933
Vaccine Damage Payments Act 1979 Statutory Sum Order 1991 SI 1991/939
British Gas plc. (Rateable Values) (Scotland) Order 1991 SI 1991/940
British Telecommunications plc. (Rateable Values) (Scotland) Order 1991 SI 1991/941
Water Undertakings (Rateable Values) (Scotland) Order 1991 SI 1991/942
Electricity Generators (Rateable Values) (Scotland) (No. 2) Order 1991 SI 1991/943
Glasgow Underground (Rateable Values) (Scotland) Order 1991 SI 1991/944
British Alcan Primary and Recycling Ltd. (Rateable Values) (Scotland) Order 1991 SI 1991/945
Mercury Communications Ltd. (Rateable Values) (Scotland) Order 1991 SI 1991/946
Scottish Power plc (Rateable Values) (Scotland) (No.2) Order 1991 SI 1991/947
British Railways Board (Rateable Values) (Scotland) Order 1991 SI 1991/948
Lochaber Power Company (Rateable Values) (Scotland) Order 1991 SI 1991/949
Scottish Hydro-Electric plc (Rateable Values) (Scotland) (No. 2) Order 1991 SI 1991/950
Representation of the People (Variation of Limits of Candidates' Election Expenses) Order 1991 SI 1991/951
Adopted Persons (Contact Register) (Fees) Rules 1991 SI 1991/952
Local Government and Housing Act 1989 (Commencement No. 12) Order 1991 SI 1991/953
Housing Act 1988 (Commencement No. 5 and Transitional Provisions) Order 1991 SI 1991/954
Public Telecommunication System Designation (Britannia Cablesystems Surrey Limited) Order 1991 SI 1991/955
Electricity Industry (Rateable Values) (Amendment) Order 1991 SI 1991/959
New Street Byelaws (Extension of Operation) (Amendment) Order 1991 SI 1991/960
Litter (Animal Droppings) Order 1991 SI 1991/961
Medicines (Products Other Than Veterinary Drugs) (Prescription Only) Amendment Order 1991 SI 1991/962
Education (London Residuary Body) (Property Transfer) (No. 2) Order 1991 SI 1991/964
Immigration (Registration with Police) (Amendment) Regulations 1991 SI 1991/965
Employment Protection Code of Practice (Time Off) Order 1991 SI 1991/968
International Carriage of Perishable Foodstuffs (Amendment) (No. 2) Regulations 1991 SI 1991/969
City of Bradford Metropolitan Council (Salts Mill to Otley Road Link Road, Canal Bridge) Scheme 1990 Confirmation Instrument 1991 SI 1991/970
Revenue Support Grant (Scotland) (No.2) Order 1991 SI 1991/971
Fertilisers (Sampling and Analysis) Regulations 1991 SI 1991/973
Housing (Prescribed forms) (No. 2) (Welsh Forms) Regulations 1991 SI 1991/974
Inspection of Premises, Children and Records (Independent Schools) Regulations 1991 SI 1991/975
Community Charges (Notices) (Substitute Charges) (England) Regulations 1991 SI 1991/979
Immigration (Variation of Leave) (Revocation) Order 1991 SI 1991/980
Petroleum (Production) (Landward Areas) Regulations 1991 SI 1991/981
Houses in Multiple Occupation (Charges for Registration Schemes) Regulations 1991 SI 1991/982
Local Government Finance (Consequential Amendment) Order 1991 SI 1991/983
Slaughterhouses (Hygiene) and Meat Inspection (Amendment) Regulations 1991 SI 1991/984
Courts and Legal Services Act 1990 (Commencement No. 4) Order 1991 SI 1991/985
Gaming Act (Variation of Monetary Limits) (Scotland) Order 1991 SI 1991/986
Gaming Clubs (Hours and Charges) (Scotland) Amendment Regulations 1991 SI 1991/987
Caribbean Territories (Abolition of Death Penalty for Murder) Order 1991 SI 1991/988
Employment Code of Practice (Trade Union Ballots on Industrial Action) Order 1991 SI 1991/989
PARLIAMENT SI 1991/992
Portsmouth Mile End Quay Harbour Revision Order 1991 SI 1991/993
Naval Medical Compassionate Fund (Amendment) Order 1991 SI 1991/994
Child Abduction and Custody (Parties to Conventions) Order 1991 SI 1991/995
Consular Fees (Amendment) Order 1991 SI 1991/996
Spain (Extradition) (Dependent Territories) Order 1991 SI 1991/997
Broadcasting Act 1990 (Isle of Man) (No. 2) Order 1991 SI 1991/998
Trustee Investments (Additional Powers) Order 1991 SI 1991/999

1001-1100
Immigration Act 1988 (Commencement No. 2) Order 1991 SI 1991/1001
County Council of Humberside (Old River Ancholme Bridge) Scheme 1990 Confirmation Instrument 1991 SI 1991/1002
City of Westminster (Ladbroke Grove Canal Bridge Widening and Harrow Road Junction Improvement) Scheme 1988 Confirmation Instrument 1991 SI 1991/1020
Motor Vehicles (Type Approval for Goods Vehicles) (Great Britain) (Amendment) Regulations 1991 SI 1991/1021
Motor Vehicles (Type Approval) (Great Britain) (Amendment) Regulations 1991 SI 1991/1022
Special Hospitals Service Authority (Functions and Membership) Amendment Regulations 1991 SI 1991/1025
Pilotage Act 1987 (Abolition of Pilotage Commission: Appointed Day) Order 1991 SI 1991/1028
Pilotage Act 1987 (Commencement No. 4) Order 1991 SI 1991/1029
Swine Fever (Amendment) Order 1991 SI 1991/1030
Savings Certificates Regulations 1991 SI 1991/1031
Estate Agents (Undesirable Practices) (No. 2) Order 1991 SI 1991/1032
Income Support (General) Amendment (No. 3) Regulations 1991 SI 1991/1033
Education (Particulars of Independent Schools) (Amendment) Regulations 1991 SI 1991/1034
North Yorkshire County Council (Rampart Bridge) Scheme 1986 Confirmation Instrument 1991 SI 1991/1035
Environmental Protection Act 1990 (Commencement No. 7) Order 1991 SI 1991/1042
Litter (Statutory Undertakers) (Designation and Relevant Land) Order 1991 SI 1991/1043
Public Telecommunication System Designation (Alphavision Communications Grim-Clee Limited) (Grimsby and Cleethorpes) Order 1991 SI 1991/1044
Public Telecommunication System Designation (Telecommunications Network Limited) (Bromley) Order 1991 SI 1991/1045
Personal Community Charge (Reductions) (England) (Amendment) (No. 3) Regulations 1991 SI 1991/1061
Manchester Ship Canal Harbour Revision Order 1990 SI 1991/1063
Public Telecommunication System Designation (Alphavision Communications Lincoln Limited) Order 1991 SI 1991/1069
Public Telecommunication System Designation (Greater Manchester Cablevision Limited) Order 1991 SI 1991/1070
Football Spectators Act 1989 (Commencement No. 3) Order 1991 SI 1991/1071
Criminal Justice (International Co-operation) Act 1990 (Commencement No. 1) Order 1991 SI 1991/1072
Magistrates' Courts (Criminal Justice (International Co-operation)) Rules 1991 SI 1991/1074
London-Brighton Trunk Road (A23 Hickstead) Order 1987, Amendment Order 1991 SI 1991/1075
London–Brighton Trunk Road (A23 Hickstead Slip Roads) Order 1987, Amendment Order 1991 SI 1991/1076
London-Brighton Trunk Road (A23 Hickstead Slip Roads) (No. 3) Order 1991 SI 1991/1077
Finance Act 1985 (Interest on Tax) (Prescribed Rate) (No.2) Order 1991 SI 1991/1078
State Awards (State Bursaries for Adult Education) (Wales) (Amendment) Regulations 1991 SI 1991/1079
Income Tax (Employments) (No. 21) Regulations 1991 SI 1991/1080
Income Tax (Sub-contractors in the Construction Industry) (Amendment) Regulations 1991 SI 1991/1081
Caledionian MacBrayne Limited (Gott Bay Pier) Harbour Revision Order 1990 SI 1991/1082
Immigration (Variation of Leave) (No.2) Order 1991 SI 1991/1083
Estate Agents (Specified Offences) (No. 2) Order 1991 SI 1991/1091
Civil Legal Aid (Financial Conditions) (Scotland) Regulations 1991 SI 1991/1094
Advice and Assistance (Financial Conditions) (Scotland) Regulations 1991 SI 1991/1095
Advice and Assistance (Scotland) (Prospective Cost) Regulations 1991 SI 1991/1096
Firemen's Pension Scheme (Amendment) Order 1991 SI 1991/1097

1101-1200
Health Promotion Authority for Wales Constitution Order 1991 SI 1991/1102
Health Promotion Authority for Wales Regulations 1991 SI 1991/1103
Financial Services Act 1986 (Extension of Scope of Act) Order 1991 SI 1991/1104
Montrose (Pilotage) Harbour Revision Order 1990 SI 1991/1106
County Council of Humberside (Newland Bridge) Scheme 1990 Confirmation Instrument 1991 SI 1991/1107
Social Security Revaluation of Earnings Factors Order 1991 SI 1991/1108
Protection of Wrecks (Designation No. 1) Order 1991 SI 1991/1110
Yorkshire Dales Light Railway Order 1991 SI 1991/1111
Children (Admissibility of Hearsay Evidence) Order 1991 SI 1991/1115
Copyright (Recording for Archives of Designated Class of Broadcasts and Cable Programmes) (Designated Bodies) Order 1991 SI 1991/1116
Taxes (Interest Rate) (Amendment) (No. 2) Regulations 1991 SI 1991/1120
Motor Vehicles (Driving Licences) (Amendment) (No. 2) Regulations 1991 SI 1991/1121
Motor Vehicles (Driving Licences) (Large Goods and Passenger-Carrying Vehicles) (Amendment) (No. 2) Regulations 1991 SI 1991/1122
Central Council for Education and Training in Social Work (Functions) Regulations 1991 SI 1991/1123
Gipsy Encampments (District of Tandridge) Order 1991 SI 1991/1125
County Court (Amendment No. 2) Rules 1991 SI 1991/1126
Community Charges and Non-Domestic Rating (Miscellaneous Provisions) Regulations 1991 SI 1991/1127
Motor Cars (Driving Instruction) (Amendment) Regulations 1991 SI 1991/1129
County Court (Forms) (Amendment No.2) Rules 1991 SI 1991/1132
A5 Trunk Road (Kilsby Diversion) Order 1991 SI 1991/1133
Education (Teachers) (Amendment) Regulations 1991 SI 1991/1134
Act of Sederunt (Shorthand Writers' Fees) 1991 SI 1991/1135
Teachers (Entitlement to Registration) (Scotland) Regulations 1991 SI 1991/1136
A11 Trunk Road (Newmarket to Red Lodge Dualling) Detrunking Order 1991 SI 1991/1137
A11 Trunk Road (Newmarket to Red Lodge Dualling) Slip Roads Order 1991 SI 1991/1138
Local Loans (Procedure) (Amendment) Regulations 1991 SI 1991/1139
Public Works Loans (Fees) (Amendment) Regulations 1991 SI 1991/1140
Charities (John Lyon Road Trust) Order 1991 SI 1991/1141
Data Protection Registration Fee Order 1991 SI 1991/1142
Public Telecommunication System Designation (Diamond Cable (Newark) Limited) Order 1991 SI 1991/1143
European Bank for Reconstruction and Development (Subscription to Capital Stock) Order 1991 SI 1991/1144
Stock Transfer (Gilt-Edged Securities) (Exempt Transfer) Regulations 1991 SI 1991/1145
A585 Trunk Road (Fleetwood Diversion) Order 1991 SI 1991/1146
A585 Trunk Road (Fleetwood Diversion) (Detrunking) Order 1991 SI 1991/1147
Specified Diseases (Notification) Order 1991 SI 1991/1155
Control of Pollution (Continuation of Byelaws) (Scotland) Order 1991 SI 1991/1156
Act of Sederunt (Rules of the Court of Session Amendment No.2) (Miscellaneous) 1991 SI 1991/1157
Act of Sederunt (Rules of the Court of Session Amendment No.4) (Shorthand Writers' Fees) 1991 SI 1991/1158
Data Protection (Fees) Regulations 1991 SI 1991/1160
Tanfield Railway (Causey Extension) Light Railway Order 1991 SI 1991/1162
Cod (Specified Sea Areas) (Prohibition of Fishing) Order 1991 SI 1991/1163
Industrial Training Levy (Engineering Board) Order 1991 SI 1991/1164
Social Security (Earnings Factor) Amendment Regulations 1991 SI 1991/1165
Superannuation (Scottish Legal Services Ombudsman) Order 1991 SI 1991/1166
Diseases of Animals (Fees for the Testing of Disinfectants) Order 1991 SI 1991/1168
Local Elections (Declaration of Acceptance of Office) (Welsh Forms) Order 1991 SI 1991/1169
Water Act 1989 (Commencement No. 5) (Scotland) Order 1991 SI 1991/1172
Control of Pollution Act 1974 (Commencement No. 20) (Scotland) Order 1991 SI 1991/1173
Public Telecommunication System Designation (Kingdom Cablevision Limited) (Glenrothes ad Kirkcaldy) Order 1991 SI 1991/1174
Income-related Benefits Schemes and Social Security (Recoupment) Amendment Regulations 1991 SI 1991/1175
Broadcasting (Restrictions on the Holding of Licences) Order 1991 SI 1991/1176
Financial Assistance (UK 2000 Scotland) (Scotland) Order 1991 SI 1991/1179
Act of Sederunt (Rules of the Court of Session Amendment No.5) (Prevention of Terrorism) 1991 SI 1991/1183
County Courts (Interest on Judgment Debts) Order 1991 SI 1991/1184
National Health Service (Service Committees and Tribunal) (Scotland) Amendment Regulations 1991 SI 1991/1188
Valuation and Community Charge Tribunals (Amendment) (Allowances) (No. 2) Regulations 1991 SI 1991/1189
Representation of the People (Amendment) Regulations 1991 SI 1991/1198
Electricity (Supply, Transmission and Generating Companies) (Target Investment Limits) Order 1991 SI 1991/1199

1201-1300
International Organisations (Tax Exempt Securities) Order 1991 SI 1991/1202
Local Government Superannuation (Reserve Forces) Regulations 1991 SI 1991/1203
Companies (Fees) Regulations 1991 SI 1991/1206
Common Investment Scheme 1991 SI 1991/1209
High Court (Distribution of Business) Order 1991 SI 1991/1210
Matrimonial and Family Proceedings Act 1984 (Commencement No. 5) Order 1991 SI 1991/1211
Channel Tunnel Rail Link (Effective Joining) Order 1991 SI 1991/1212
Veterinary Surgeons Qualifications (EEC Recognition) (German Democratic Republic Qualifications) Order 1991 SI 1991/1218
Dangerous Vessels (Northern Ireland) Order 1991 SI 1991/1219
Planning(Northern Ireland) Order 1991 SI 1991/1220
European Communities (Employment in the Civil Service) Order 1991 SI 1991/1221
County Court Remedies Regulations 1991 SI 1991/1222
Criminal Justice (International Co-operation) Act 1990 (Designation of Prosecuting Authorities) Order 1991 SI 1991/1224
Coal Industry (Restructuring Grants) Order 1991 SI 1991/1225
Representation of the People (Scotland) Amendment Regulations 1991 SI 1991/1226
Court Funds (Amendment) Rules 1991 SI 1991/1227
European Economic Interest Grouping (Fees) (Amendment) Regulations 1991 SI 1991/1228
Charge Limitation (England) (Maximum Amounts) Order 1991 SI 1991/1230
Food (Miscellaneous Revocations) Regulations 1991 SI 1991/1231
Food Protection (Emergency Prohibitions) (Paralytic Shellfish Poisoning) Order 1991 SI 1991/1235
Channel Tunnel (Emergency Medical Services) (No. 2) Order 1991 SI 1991/1236
European Parliamentary Elections (Amendment) Regulations 1991 SI 1991/1243
Representation of the People Act 1990 (Commencement No. 1) Order 1991 SI 1991/1244
Administration of Justice Act 1982 (Commencement No. 6) Order 1991 SI 1991/1245
Cable (Excepted Programmes) Order 1991 SI 1991/1246
Family Proceedings Rules 1991 SI 1991/1247
Inheritance Tax (Delivery of Accounts) Regulations 1991 SI 1991/1248
Inheritance Tax (Delivery of Accounts) (Scotland) Regulations 1991 SI 1991/1249
Inheritance Tax (Delivery of Accounts) (Northern Ireland) Regulations 1991 SI 1991/1250
Movement of Animals (Restrictions) (Amendment) Order 1991 SI 1991/1251
Law Reform (Miscellaneous Provisions) (Scotland) Act 1990 (Commencement No. 6) Order 1991 SI 1991/1252
Civic Government (Scotland) Act 1982 (Licensing of Houses in Multiple Occupation) Order 1991 SI 1991/1253
Motor Vehicles (Wearing of Seat Belts in Rear Seats by Adults) Regulations 1991 SI 1991/1255
Financial Services Act 1986 (Delegation) (No. 2) Order 1991 SI 1991/1256
Sealink, (Transfer of Newhaven Harbour) Harbour Revision Order 1991 SI 1991/1257
Sealink (Transfer of Heysham Harbour) Harbour Revision Order 1991 SI 1991/1258
Companies (Forms) (No.2) Regulations 1991 SI 1991/1259
Registration of Births, Still-Births and Deaths (Prescription of Errors) (Scotland) Regulations 1991 SI 1991/1260
Adopted Children Register (Form of Entry) (Scotland) Regulations 1991 SI 1991/1261
A23 Trunk Road (Pease Pottage and Handcross Trunk Road and Slip Road) Order 1991 SI 1991/1263
Employment Codes of Practice (Revocation) Order 1991 SI 1991/1264
Education (Information on School Examination Results) (England) Regulations 1991 SI 1991/1265
Education (School Curriculum and Related Information) (Amendment) Regulations 1991 SI 1991/1278
New Towns (Transfer of Housing Stock) (Amendment) Regulations 1991 SI 1991/1281
Smoke Control Areas (Authorised Fuels) Regulations 1991 SI 1991/1282
A638 Trunk Road (Doncaster North Bridge Relief Road) Order 1991 SI 1991/1283
Fruit Juices and Fruit Nectars (England, Wales and Scotland) (Amendment) Regulations 1991 SI 1991/1284
Controlled Drugs (Substances Useful for Manufacture) Regulations 1991 SI 1991/1285
Customs Duty (Personal Reliefs) (Amendment) Order 1991 SI 1991/1286
Customs and Excise Duties (Personal Reliefs for Goods Permanently Imported) (Amendment) Order 1991 SI 1991/1287
Crown Court (Amendment) Rules 1991 SI 1991/1288
Public Telecommunication System Designation (Comment Cablevision North East Partnership) (Tyneside) Order 1991 SI 1991/1292
Customs and Excise Duties (Personal Reliefs for Goods Temporarily Imported) (Amendment) Order 1991 SI 1991/1293
Lee Valley and South Staffordshire (Pipelaying and Other Works) (Codes of Practice) Order 1991 SI 1991/1294
Food Protection (Emergency Prohibitions) (Paralytic Shellfish Poisoning) (No.2) Order 1991 SI 1991/1295
Food Protection (Emergency Prohibitions) (Paralytic Shellfish Poisoning) (No.3) Order 1991 SI 1991/1296
Criminal Justice (International Co-operation) Act 1990 (Exercise of Powers) Order 1991 SI 1991/1297
Merchant Shipping (Load Lines) (Exemption) (Amendment) Order 1991 SI 1991/1298
Education (Student Loans) Regulations 1991 SI 1991/1299
Merchant Shipping (Life-Saving Appliances) (Amendment) Regulations 1991 SI 1991/1300

1301-1400
London Cab Order 1991 SI 1991/1301
Home-Grown Cereals Authority Levy (Variation) Scheme (Approval) Order 1991  SI 1991/1302
Home-Grown Cereals Authority (Rate of Levy) Order 1991 SI 1991/1303
Police Pensions (Additional Voluntary Contributions) Regulations 1991 SI 1991/1304
Industrial Training (Engineering Construction Board) Order 1991 SI 1991/1305
Motor Vehicles (Type Approval and Approval Marks) (Fees) Regulations 1991 SI 1991/1318
Environmental Protection Act 1990 (Commencement No. 8) Order 1991 SI 1991/1319
Nursing Homes Registration (Scotland) Amendment Regulations 1991 SI 1991/1320
Street Litter Control Notices Order SI 1991/1324
Litter Control Areas Order 1991 SI 1991/1325
Gipsy Encampments (City of Worcester) Order 1991 SI 1991/1326
Norfolk Ambulance National Health Service Trust (Establishment) Amendment Order 1991 SI 1991/1327
County Court (Amendment No. 3) Rules 1991 SI 1991/1328
Rules of the Supreme Court (Amendment No. 2) 1991 SI 1991/1329
Value Added Tax (General) (Amendment) (No. 2) Regulations 1991 SI 1991/1332
Water Supply (Water Quality) (Scotland) Amendment Regulations 1991 SI 1991/1333
Public Telecommunication System Designation (Britannia Cablesystems Solent Limited) Order 1991 SI 1991/1334
Public Telecommunication System Designation (Clyde Cablevision) (Paisley and Renfrew) Order 1991 SI 1991/1335
Public Telecommunication System Designation (Telford Telecommunications Limited) Order 1991 SI 1991/1336
Premium Savings Bonds (Amendment No.2) Regulations 1991 SI 1991/1337
Farm and Conservation Grant (Variation) Scheme 1991 SI 1991/1338
Farm Diversification Grant (Variation) (No. 2) Scheme 1991 SI 1991/1339
County Court (Forms) (Amendment No. 3) Rules 1991 SI 1991/1340
Merchant Shipping (Radio and Radio-Navigational Equipment Survey) Regulations 1991 SI 1991/1341
Fishing Vessels (Safety Provisions) (Amendment) Rules 1991 SI 1991/1342
Food Hygiene (Amendment) Regulations 1991 SI 1991/1343
Electricity (Standards of Performance) Regulations 1991 SI 1991/1344
A1 Trunk Road (Haringey) Red Route Experimental Traffic (Amendment) Order 1991 SI 1991/1345
A1 Trunk Road (Islington) Red Route Experimental Traffic (Amendment) Order 1991 SI 1991/1346
National Health Service Trusts (Consultation on Dissolution) Regulations 1991 SI 1991/1347
National Health Service (General Dental Services) Amendment Regulations 1991 SI 1991/1348
National Health Service (General Dental Services) (Scotland) Amendment Regulations 1991 SI 1991/1349
Public Telecommunication System Designation (Clyde Cablevision) (Greater Glasgow) Order 1991 SI 1991/1350
Building Societies (Designation of Qualifying Bodies) (Amendment) Order 1991 SI 1991/1358
Public Telecommunication System Designation (Britannia Cablesystems Darlington Limited) Order 1991 SI 1991/1359
Public Telecommunication System Designation (Clyde Cablevision) (Bearsden and Milngavie) Order 1991 SI 1991/1360
Public Telecommunication System Designation (Clyde Cablevision) (Inverclyde) Order 1991 SI 1991/1361
Public Telecommunication System Designation (Diamond Cable (Melton Mowbray) Limited) Order 1991 SI 1991/1362
Public Telecommunication System Designation (Videotron Harrow Limited) Order 1991 SI 1991/1363
Courts and Legal Services Act 1990 (Commencement No. 5) Order 1991 SI 1991/1364
Merchant Shipping Act 1970 (Unregistered Fishing Vessels) Regulations 1991 SI 1991/1365
Merchant Shipping Act 1970 (Unregistered Ships) Regulations 1991 SI 1991/1366
Merchant Shipping Act 1988 (unregistered Ships) Regulations 1991 SI 1991/1367
Taxes (Interest Rate) (Amendment No.3) Regulations 1991 SI 1991/1377
Sea Fish (Specified Sea Areas) (Regulation of Nets and Other Fishing Gear) Order 1991 SI 1991/1380
Blue Eared Pig Disease Order 1991 SI 1991/1381
Price Marking Order 1991 SI 1991/1382
Food Protection (Emergency Prohibitions) (Paralytic Shellfish Poisoning) (No. 3) Revocation Order 1991 SI 1991/1386
Education Reform Act 1988 (Application of Section 122 to Institutions in Wales) Order 1991 SI 1991/1391
Medicines (Veterinary Drugs) (Prescription Only) Order 1991 SI 1991/1392
Consumer Credit (Exempt Agreements) (Amendment) Order 1991 SI 1991/1393
Family Proceedings Courts (Children Act 1989) Rules 1991 SI 1991/1395
Eggs (Marketing Standards) (Amendment) Regulations 1991 SI 1991/1396
Act of Sederunt (Messengers-at-Arms and Sheriff Officers Rules) 1991 SI 1991/1397
Local Government (Committees and Political Groups) (Amendment) Regulations 1991 SI 1991/1398
Crop Residues (Restrictions on Burning) Regulations 1991 SI 1991/1399

1401-1500
Erskine Bridge Tolls Extension Order 1991 SI 1991/1402
Housing Renovation etc. Grants (Prescribed Forms and Particulars) (Welsh Forms and Particulars) (Amendment) Regulations 1991 SI 1991/1403
Merchant Shipping (Fees) (Amendment) Regulations 1991 SI 1991/1404
Family Proceedings Courts (Constitution) Rules 1991 SI 1991/1405
Farm Business Non-Capital Grant (Variation) Scheme 1991 SI 1991/1406
Savings Certificates (Children's Bonus Bonds) Regulations 1991 SI 1991/1407
Broadcasting (Independent Productions) Order 1991 SI 1991/1408
Water (Compulsory Works Powers) (Notice) Regulations 1991 SI 1991/1409
County Council of Humberside (River Hull Tunnel) Scheme 1989 Confirmation Instrument 1991 SI 1991/1411
Veterinary Surgeons Act 1966 (Schedule 3 Amendment) Order 1991 SI 1991/1412
Act of Sederunt (Rules of the Court of Session Amendment No.6) (Discharge of Judicial Factors) 1991 SI 1991/1413
Emergency Protection Order (Transfer of Responsibilities) Regulations 1991 SI 1991/1414
Food Protection (Emergency Prohibitions) (Paralytic Shellfish Poisoning) (Revocation) Order 1991 SI 1991/1415
Family Proceedings Courts (Constitution) (Metropolitan Area) Rules 1991 SI 1991/1426
Education (University Commissioners) Order 1991 SI 1991/1427
Trade Marks and Service Marks (Amendment) Rules 1991 SI 1991/1431
Hill Livestock (Compensatory Allowances) (Amendment) (No.2) Regulations 1991 SI 1991/1439
A406 London North Circular Trunk Road (Improvement between Silver Street and Hall Lane, Supplementary Trunk Road and Slip Roads) Order 1991 SI 1991/1446
A406 London North Circular Trunk Road (Improvement between Silver Street and Hall Lane Trunk Roads, Slip Roads and Bridge) Order 1991 SI 1991/1447
Companies Act 1989 (Commencement No. 11) Order 1991 SI 1991/1452
Education (Inner London Education Authority) (Transfer of Functions) Order 1991 SI 1991/1457
Education (School Teachers' Pay and Conditions) Order 1991 SI 1991/1459
Child Abduction and Custody (Parties to Conventions) (Amendment) Order 1991 SI 1991/1461
Cinemas (Northern Ireland) Order 1991 SI 1991/1462
Criminal Justice (International Co-operation) Act 1990 (Enforcement of Overseas Forfeiture Orders) Order 1991 SI 1991/1463
Criminal Justice (International Co-operation) Act 1990 (Enforcement of Overseas Forfeiture Orders) (Northern Ireland) Order 1991 SI 1991/1464
Drug Trafficking Offences Act 1986 (Designated Countries and Territories) (Amendment) Order 1991 SI 1991/1465
Fisheries (Amendment) (Northern Ireland) Order 1991 SI 1991/1466
Confiscation of the Proceeds of Drug Trafficking (Designated Countries and Territories) (Scotland) Order 1991 SI 1991/1467
Criminal Justice (International Co-operation) Act 1990 (Enforcement of Overseas Forfeiture Orders) (Scotland) Order 1991 SI 1991/1468
Merchant Shipping (Categorisation of Registries of Overseas Territories) (Amendment) Order 1991 SI 1991/1469
Gas (Meters) (Amendment) Regulations 1991 SI 1991/1471
Finance Act 1985 (Interest on Tax) (Prescribed Rate) (No.3) Order 1991 SI 1991/1472
Cod (Specified Sea Areas) (Prohibition of Fishing) (No. 2) Order 1991 SI 1991/1473
Medicines (Products for Human Use — Fees) Regulations 1991 SI 1991/1474
Feeding Stuffs (Amendment) Regulations 1991 SI 1991/1475
Food Safety (Exports) Regulations 1991 SI 1991/1476
Welfare of Pigs Regulations 1991 SI 1991/1477
Parental Responsibility Agreement Regulations 1991 SI 1991/1478
North Surrey Water Company (Constitution and Regulation) Order 1991 SI 1991/1479
Winchester–Preston Trunk Road (A34) (Newbury Bypass) Order 1991 SI 1991/1480
Winchester-Preston Trunk Road (A34) (Newbury Bypass Detrunking) Order 1991 SI 1991/1481
Winchester-Preston Trunk Road (A34) (Newbury Bypass) Slip Roads Order 1991 SI 1991/1482
Winchester-Preston Trunk Road (A34) (Newbury Bypass) Slip Roads (No 2) Order 1991 SI 1991/1483
Advisory Committee on Hazardous Substances Order 1991 SI 1991/1487
Advisory Committee on Hazardous Substances (Terms of Office) Regulations 1991 SI 1991/1488
St Mary's Music School (Aided Places) Amendment Regulations 1991 SI 1991/1494
Education (Assisted Places) (Scotland) Amendment Regulations 1991 SI 1991/1495
Immigration (Carriers' Liability Prescribed Sum) Order 1991 SI 1991/1497

1501-1600
Public Telecommunication System Designation (Videotron South Limited) (Winchester) Order 1991 SI 1991/1503
Children (Secure Accommodation) Regulations 1991 SI 1991/1505
Children's Homes Regulations 1991 SI 1991/1506
Refuges (Children's Homes and Foster Placements) Regulations 1991 SI 1991/1507
Education (School Teacher Appraisal) Regulations 1991 SI 1991/1511
Prosecution of Offences (Custody Time Limits) (Amendment) Regulations 1991 SI 1991/1515
Financial Services Act 1986 (Schedule 1 (Amendment) and Miscellaneous Exemption) Order 1991 SI 1991/1516
Police Pensions (Amendment) Regulations 1991 SI 1991/1517
Building Societies Act 1986 (Continuance of section 41) Order 1991 Approved by both Houses of Parliament SI 1991/1518
Disability Living Allowance and Disability Working Allowance Act 1991 (Commencement No. 1) Order 1991 SI 1991/1519
Family Credit (General) Amendment Regulations 1991 SI 1991/1520
Rent Regulation (Forms and Information etc.) (Scotland) Regulations 1991 SI 1991/1521
Students' Allowances (Scotland) Regulations 1991 SI 1991/1522
Wireless Telegraphy Apparatus (Low Power Devices) (Exemption) Regulations 1991 SI 1991/1523
Motor Vehicles (Tests) (Amendment) (No. 3) Regulations 1991 SI 1991/1525
Road Vehicles (Construction and Use) (Amendment) (No. 1) Regulations 1991 SI 1991/1526
Road Vehicles (Construction and Use) (Amendment) (No. 2) Regulations 1991 SI 1991/1527
Building (Procedure) (Scotland) Amendment (No. 2) Regulations 1991 SI 1991/1528
Tobacco Products Labelling (Safety) Regulations 1991 SI 1991/1530
Control of Explosives Regulations 1991 SI 1991/1531
Food Protection (Emergency Prohibitions) (Paralytic Shellfish Poisoning) (No.4) Order 1991 SI 1991/1533
Town and Country Planning General Development (Amendment) Order 1991 SI 1991/1536
Seed Potatoes (Fees) (Amendment) Regulations 1991 SI 1991/1537
Northern Ireland Act 1974 (Interim Period Extension) Order 1991 SI 1991/1538
Public Works Loans (Fees) Regulations 1991 SI 1991/1539
Human Fertilisation and Embryology (Statutory Storage Period) Regulations 1991 SI 1991/1540
Motor Vehicles (Driving Licences) (Large Goods and Passenger-Carrying Vehicles) (Amendment) (No. 3) Regulations 1991 SI 1991/1541
North-West of Doncaster-Kendal Trunk Road (Airedale Route) (Bingley to Cottingley Bar Section and Slip Roads) Order 1991 SI 1991/1542
North-West of Doncaster—Kendal Trunk Road (Airedale Route—Bingley to Kildwick and Link Road) Order 1982 Variation (No. 2) Order 1991 SI 1991/1543
North-West of Doncaster-Kendal Trunk Road (Airedale Route) (Crossflatts to Cottingley Bar Section) (De-Trunking) Order 1991 SI 1991/1544
Immigration Appeals (Procedure) (Amendment) Rules 1991 SI 1991/1545
A5 Trunk Road (Fazeley Two Gates Wilnecote Bypass and Slip Roads) Order 1991 SI 1991/1558
Income Support (General) Amendment No. 4 Regulations 1991 SI 1991/1559
British Shipbuilders Regulations 1991 SI 1991/1560
A40 Trunk Road (Gipsy Corner Junction Improvement, Trunk Road and Slip Roads) Order 1991 SI 1991/1561
A40 Trunk Road (Western Circus Junction Improvement, Trunk Road and Slip Roads) Order 1991 SI 1991/1562
Football (Offences) Act 1991 (Commencement) Order 1991 SI 1991/1564
Football (Offences) (Designation of Football Matches) Order 1991 SI 1991/1565
Companies Act 1989 (Register of Auditors and Information about Audit Firms) Regulations 1991 SI 1991/1566
Town and Country Planning (Use Classes) (Amendment) Order 1991 SI 1991/1567
Environmental Protection Act 1990 (Commencement No. 9) Order 1991 SI 1991/1577
A38 Trunk Road (Improvement at Twowatersfoot) Order 1991 SI 1991/1581
Education (Pupils' Attendance Records) Regulations 1991 SI 1991/1582
Export of Goods (Control) (Amendment No. 7) Order 1991 SI 1991/1583
Access to Personal Files (Social Services) (Amendment) Regulations 1991 SI 1991/1587
Human Fertilisation and Embryology (Special Exemptions) Regulations 1991 SI 1991/1588
Crop Residues (Restrictions on Burning) (No. 2) Regulations 1991 SI 1991/1590
Hormonal Substances (Food Sources) (Animals) Regulations 1991 SI 1991/1593
Leeds General Infirmary and Associated Hospitals National Health Service Trust (Change of Name) Order 1991 SI 1991/1594
Child Benefit and Social Security (Fixing and Adjustment of Rates) Amendment No. 2 Regulations 1991 SI 1991/1595
Essex Water Company (Constitution and Regulation) Order 1991 SI 1991/1596
Bathing Waters (Classification) Regulations 1991 SI 1991/1597
Housing Benefit and Community Charge Benefits (Miscellaneous) Amendment Regulations 1991 SI 1991/1599
Income Support (Transitional) Amendment Regulations 1991 SI 1991/1600

1601-1700
Fodder Plant Seeds (Amendment) Regulations 1991 SI 1991/1601
Oil and Fibre Plant Seeds (Amendment) Regulations 1991 SI 1991/1602
Food Protection (Emergency Prohibitions) (Paralytic Shellfish Poisoning) (No.5) Order 1991 SI 1991/1608
Bathing Waters (Classification) (Scotland) Regulations 1991 SI 1991/1609
Retirement Benefits Schemes (Restriction on Discretion to Approve) (Small Self-administered Schemes) Regulations 1991 SI 1991/1614
County Council of Somerset (Bridgwater Bypass) (North) (River Parrett Bridge) Scheme 1988 Confirmation Instrument 1991 SI 1991/1615
Dartmoor National Park (Restriction of Agricultural Operations) Order 1991 SI 1991/1616
Social Security (Overlapping Benefits) Amendment (No. 2) Regulations 1991 SI 1991/1617
Control of Pollution (Amendment) Act 1989 (Commencement) Order 1991 SI 1991/1618
Isle of Wight Light Railway Order 1991 SI 1991/1619
Construction Products Regulations 1991 SI 1991/1620
Act of Sederunt (Rules of the Court of Session Amendment No.7) (Patents Rules) 1991 SI 1991/1621
Controlled Waste (Registration of Carriers and Seizure of Vehicles) Regulations 1991 SI 1991/1624
Recovery of Tax in Summary Proceedings (Financial Limits) Order 1991 SI 1991/1625
Design Right (Proceedings before Comptroller) (Amendment) Rules 1991 SI 1991/1626
Patents (Fees) Rules 1991 SI 1991/1627
Registered Designs (Fees) Rules 1991 SI 1991/1628
Public Telecommunication System Designation (Oxford Cable Limited) Order 1991 SI 1991/1629
Farm and Conservation Grant Regulations 1991 SI 1991/1630
Farm Woodland (Variation) Scheme 1991 Approved by both Houses of Parliament SI 1991/1631
Social Security (Contributions) Amendment (No.4) Regulations 1991 SI 1991/1632
Broads Authority (Pilotage Powers) Order 1991 SI 1991/1633
Representation of the People Act 1991 (Commencement) Order 1991 SI 1991/1634
Import and Export (Plant Health Fees) (England and Wales) (Amendment) Order 1991 SI 1991/1640
North Hull Housing Action Trust (Area and Constitution) Order 1991 Approved by both Houses of Parliament SI 1991/1641
Human Organ Transplants and the United Kingdom Transplant Support Service Authority (Miscellaneous Amendments) Regulations 1991 SI 1991/1645
Companies (Disclosure of Interests in Shares) (Orders imposing restrictions on shares) Regulations 1991 SI 1991/1646
Public Telecommunication System Designation (Mercury Personal Communications Network Limited) Order 1991 SI 1991/1647
Public Telecommunication System Designation (Microtel Communications Limited) Order 1991 SI 1991/1648
Public Telecommunication System Designation (Unitel Limited) Order 1991 SI 1991/1649
Income Support (General) Amendment (No. 5) Regulations 1991 SI 1991/1656
Education (National Curriculum) (Exceptions) (Wales) Regulations 1991 SI 1991/1657
Education (School Curriculum and Related Information) (Wales) Regulations 1991 SI 1991/1658
Treasury Bills (Amendment) Regulations 1991 SI 1991/1667
Education (National Curriculum) (Attainment Targets and Programmes of Study in History) (Wales) (Amendment) Order 1991 SI 1991/1668
Civil Aviation Authority Regulations 1991 SI 1991/1672
Police (Discipline) (Amendment) Regulations 1991 SI 1991/1673
Representation of the People (Northern Ireland) (Variation of Specified Documents and Amendment) Regulations 1991 SI 1991/1674
European Parliamentary Elections (Northern Ireland) (Amendment) Regulations 1991 SI 1991/1675
Slaughter of Poultry (Licences and Specified Qualifications) Regulations 1991 SI 1991/1676
Children (Allocation of Proceedings) Order 1991 SI 1991/1677
Air Navigation (Restriction of Flying) (High Security Prisons) (Amendment) Regulations 1991 SI 1991/1679
National Health Service (Optical Charges and Payments) Amendment Regulations 1991 SI 1991/1680
Food Protection (Emergency Prohibitions) (Paralytic Shellfish Poisoning) (No.6) Order 1991 SI 1991/1681
Testing in Primary Schools (Scotland) Amendment Regulations 1991 SI 1991/1682
Education (National Curriculum) (Attainment Targets and Programmes of Study in Welsh) (Amendment) Order 1991 SI 1991/1683
Deposit Protection Board (Increase of Borrowing Limit) Order 1991 SI 1991/1684
House of Commons Members' Fund (Variation) Order 1991 SI 1991/1685
Representation of the People Act 1990 (Commencement No.2) Order 1991 SI 1991/1686
Returning Officers' Charges Order 1991 SI 1991/1687
Returning Officer's Charges (Northern Ireland) Order 1991 SI 1991/1688
Child Minding and Day Care (Applications for Registration) Regulations 1991 SI 1991/1689
Price Marking (Amendment) Order 1991 SI 1991/1690
Public Telecommunication System Designation (General Cable Limited)(Bradford) Order 1991 SI 1991/1691
A11 Trunk Road (Besthorpe to Wymondham Improvement) Detrunking Order 1991 SI 1991/1692
A11 Trunk Road (Besthorpe to Wymondham Improvement and Slip Roads) Order 1991 SI 1991/1693
International Organisations (Miscellaneous Exemptions) Order 1991 SI 1991/1694
Taxes (Interest Rate) (Amendment No. 4) Regulations 1991 SI 1991/1695
Army, Air Force and Naval Discipline Acts (Continuation) Order 1991 SI 1991/1696
Air Navigation (Overseas Territories) (Amendment) (No. 2) Order 1991 SI 1991/1697
Child Abduction and Custody (Parties to Conventions) (Amendment) (No.2) Order 1991 SI 1991/1698
Extradition (Aviation Security) Order 1991 SI 1991/1699
Extradition (Designated Commonwealth Countries) Order 1991 SI 1991/1700

1701-1800
Extradition (Drug Trafficking) Order 1991 SI 1991/1701
Extradition (Torture) Order 1991 SI 1991/1702
Merchant Shipping Act 1988 (Bermuda) Order 1991 SI 1991/1703
Vienna Document (Privileges and Immunities) Order 1991 SI 1991/1704
Dentists Act 1984 (Dental Auxiliaries) Amendment Order 1991 SI 1991/1705
Dental Auxiliaries (Amendment) Regulations 1991 SI 1991/1706
Access to Personal Files and Medical Reports (Northern Ireland) Order 1991 SI 1991/1707
Appropriation (No. 2) (Northern Ireland) Order 1991 SI 1991/1708
Broadcasting Act 1990 (Guernsey) (No. 2) Order 1991 SI 1991/1709
Broadcasting Act 1990 (Jersey) (No. 2) Order 1991 SI 1991/1710
Criminal Justice (Northern Ireland) Order 1991 SI 1991/1711
Disability Living Allowance and Disability Working Allowance (Northern Ireland) Order 1991 SI 1991/1712
Fair Employment (Amendment) (Northern Ireland) Order 1991 SI 1991/1713
Genetically Modified Organisms (Northern Ireland) Order 1991 SI 1991/1714
Local Elections (Northern Ireland) (Amendment) Order 1991 SI 1991/1715
Nuclear Material (Offences) Act 1983 (Commencement) Order 1991 SI 1991/1716
Nuclear Material (Offences) Act 1983 (Guernsey) Order 1991 SI 1991/1717
Nuclear Material (Offences) Act 1983 (Jersey) Order 1991 SI 1991/1718
Nuclear Material (Offences) Act 1983 (Isle of Man) Order 1991 SI 1991/1719
Extradition (Protection of Nuclear Material) Order 1991 SI 1991/1720
Statistics (Confidentiality) (Northern Ireland) Order 1991 SI 1991/1721
Territorial Sea Act 1987 (Isle of Man) Order 1991 SI 1991/1722
Family Law Act 1986 (Dependent Territories) Order 1991 SI 1991/1723
Reciprocal Enforcement of Foreign Judgments (Canada) (Amendment) Order 1991 SI 1991/1724
Films Co-Production Agreements (Amendment) Order 1991 SI 1991/1725
Air Navigation (Second Amendment) Order 1991 SI 1991/1726
Motor Vehicles (International Circulation) (Amendment) (No. 2) Order 1991 SI 1991/1727
Transfer of Functions (Returning Officers' Charges) Order 1991 SI 1991/1728
Building Societies Act 1986 (Modifications) Order 1991 SI 1991/1729
Local Government Finance (Repeals and Consequential Amendments) Order 1991 SI 1991/1730
National Health Service (Optical Charges and Payments) (Scotland) Amendment Regulations 1991 SI 1991/1731
Hearing Aid Council (Disciplinary Proceedings) Legal Assessor (Amendment) Rules 1991 SI 1991/1732
Mid Southern Water Company (Constitution and Regulation) Order 1991 SI 1991/1733
Public Telecommunication System Designation (Northampton Cable Television Limited) (Northeast Northamptonshire) Order 1991 SI 1991/1734
Agricultural Marketing Act 1958 and Milk Marketing Schemes (Amendment) (Scotland) Regulations 1991 SI 1991/1735
United Kingdom Atomic Energy Authority (Limit on Borrowing) Order 1991 SI 1991/1736
Free Zone (Birmingham Airport) Designation Order 1991 SI 1991/1737
Free Zone (Liverpool) Designation Order 1991 SI 1991/1738
Free Zone (Prestwick Airport) Designation Order 1991 SI 1991/1739
Free Zone (Southampton) Designation Order 1991 SI 1991/1740
Finance Act 1991 (Savings-related Share Option Schemes) (Appointed Day) Order 1991 SI 1991/1741
Dangerous Dogs Act 1991 (Commencement and Appointed Day) Order 1991 SI 1991/1742
Dangerous Dogs (Designated Types) Order 1991 SI 1991/1743
Dangerous Dogs Compensation and Exemption Schemes Order 1991 SI 1991/1744
Montrose Harbour Revision Order 1991 SI 1991/1745
Disability Living Allowance Advisory Board Regulations 1991 SI 1991/1746
Social Security (Severe Disablement Allowance) Amendment Regulations 1991 SI 1991/1747
Legal Aid (Disclosure of Information) Regulations 1991 SI 1991/1753
Value Added Tax Act 1983 (Interest on Overpayments etc.) (Prescribed Rate) Order 1991 SI 1991/1754
Car Tax (Amendment) Regulations 1991 SI 1991/1755
Ecclesiastical Judges and Legal Officers (Fees) Order 1991 SI 1991/1756
Legal Officers (Annual Fees) Order 1991 SI 1991/1757
Parochial Fees Order 1991 SI 1991/1758
Northern Ireland (Emergency Provisions) Regulations 1991 SI 1991/1759
River Colne Barrier (Wivenhoe) Order 1991 SI 1991/1760
Education (Assisted Places) (Amendment) Regulations 1991 SI 1991/1767
Education (Training Grants) (Amendment) Regulations 1991 SI 1991/1768
Diseases of Animals (Approved Disinfectants) (Amendment) (No. 3) Order 1991 SI 1991/1770
Swansea Bay Port Health Authority Order 1991 SI 1991/1773
Weights and Measures (Local and Working Standard Weights and Testing Equipment) (Amendment) Regulations 1991 SI 1991/1775
Banking Act 1987 (Meaning of Deposit) Order 1991 SI 1991/1776
Plant Health (Great Britain) (Amendment) (No. 2) Order 1991 SI 1991/1777
Public Telecommunication System Designation (Videotron Thamesmead Limited) Order 1991 SI 1991/1778
Public Telecommunication System Designation (West Midlands Cable Communications Limited) Order 1991 SI 1991/1779
Local Government (Interest on Repayments of Rates) (Scotland) Order 1991 SI 1991/1780
Administration of Justice Act 1982 (Commencement No. 7) Order 1991 SI 1991/1786
Building Societies (Liquid Asset) (Amendment) Regulations 1991 SI 1991/1785
Administration of Justice Act 1982 (Commencement No. 7) Order 1991 SI 1991/1786
Education (London Residuary Body) (Property Transfer) (No. 3) Order 1991 SI 1991/1787
Companies House Trading Fund Order 1991 SI 1991/1795
Patent Office Trading Fund Order 1991 SI 1991/1796
Merchant Shipping (Light Dues) (Amendment) (No. 2) Regulations 1991 SI 1991/1797
Gaming Licence Duty Regulations 1991 SI 1991/1798
A49 Trunk Road (Onibury to Stokesay Improvement) Order 1991 SI 1991/1799
Food Protection (Emergency Prohibitions) (Paralytic Shellfish Poisoning) (No.2 Partial Revocation) and (Nos.4 and 5 Revocation) Order 1991 SI 1991/1800

1801-1900
Children (Allocation of Proceedings) (Appeals) Order 1991 SI 1991/1801
Education (Bursaries for Teacher Training) (Amendment) Regulations 1991 SI 1991/1804
Dartford-Thurrock Crossing (Amendment) Regulations 1991 SI 1991/1805
Dartford-Thurrock Crossing Tolls Order 1991 SI 1991/1808
Civil Courts (Amendment) Order 1991 SI 1991/1809
Food Protection (Emergency Prohibitions) (Paralytic Shellfish Poisoning) (No.7) Order 1991 SI 1991/1810
Forth Ports Authority (Rateable Values) (Scotland) Order 1991 SI 1991/1811
Caledonian MacBrayne Limited (Rateable Values) (Scotland) Order 1991 SI 1991/1812
Education (School Curriculum and Related Information) (Wales) (Amendment) Regulations 1991 SI 1991/1813
 The Halton (Parishes) Order 1991 S.I. 1991/1814
Register of County Court Judgments (Amendment) Regulations 1991 SI 1991/1815
Criminal Justice (International Co-operation) Act 1990 (Detention and Forfeiture of Drug Trafficking Cash) Order 1991 SI 1991/1816
Merchant Shipping (Certification of Deck Officers and Marine Engineer Officers) (Amendment) Regulations 1991 SI 1991/1819
Broadcasting (Prescribed Countries) Order 1991 SI 1991/1820
Petty Sessional Divisions (Hampshire) Order 1991 SI 1991/1828
Education (Assisted Places) (Incidental Expenses) (Amendment) Regulations 1991 SI 1991/1830
Education (Grants) (Music and Ballet Schools) (Amendment) Regulations 1991 SI 1991/1831
Family Proceedings (Costs) Rules 1991 SI 1991/1832
Public Telecommunication System Designation (Windsor Television Limited) (Iver Heath and Laleham) Order 1991 SI 1991/1833
Water Supply (Water Quality) (Amendment) Regulations 1991 SI 1991/1837
Education (Mandatory Awards) Regulations 1991 SI 1991/1838
Education (Fees and Awards) (Amendment) (No. 2) Regulations 1991 SI 1991/1839
Education (Teachers) (Amendment) (No.2) Regulations 1991 SI 1991/1840
A12 Trunk Road (Eastern Avenue, Redbridge) (Prohibition of Right Turn and U-Turns) Order 1991 SI 1991/1842
Temporary Set-Aside Regulations 1991 SI 1991/1847
Food Protection (Emergency Prohibitions) (Paralytic Shellfish Poisoning) (No.2) Order 1991 Revocation Order 1991 SI 1991/1848
Food Protection (Emergency Prohibitions) (Paralytic Shellfish Poisoning) (No.8) Order 1991 SI 1991/1849
Education (National Curriculum) (Assessment Arrangements for Welsh Second Language) (Key Stage 1) Order 1991 SI 1991/1851
Newport (Gwent) Harbour Revision Order 1991 SI 1991/1852
Falmouth Harbour Revision Order 1991 SI 1991/1853
Education (National Curriculum) (Assessment Arrangements for English, Welsh, Mathematics and Science) (Key Stage 1) (Wales) Order 1991 SI 1991/1860
Food Protection (Emergency Prohibitions) (Poisonous Substances in Cattle) (Wales) Order 1991 SI 1991/1863
M6 Motorway (Widening and Improvements Between Junctions 30 and 32) and Connecting Roads Scheme 1991 SI 1991/1873
School Teachers' Pay and Conditions Act 1991 (Commencement No. 1) Order 1991 SI 1991/1874
A38 Trunk Road (Bell Bridge to Alrewas Improvements) (Fradley Lane Slip Roads) Order 1991 SI 1991/1875
Non-Contentious Probate (Amendment) Rules 1991 SI 1991/1876
County Court Appeals Order 1991 SI 1991/1877
Social Security (Adjudication) Amendment Regulations 1991 SI 1991/1878
Sheep Scab (National Dip) (Amendment) Order 1991 SI 1991/1879
Adoption (Amendment) Rules 1991 SI 1991/1880
Children Act 1989 (Consequential Amendment of Enactments) Order 1991 SI 1991/1881
County Court (Amendment No. 4) Rules 1991 SI 1991/1882
Courts and Legal Services Act 1990 (Commencement No. 6) Order 1991 SI 1991/1883
Rules of the Supreme Court (Amendment No. 3) 1991 SI 1991/1884
Agricultural Holdings (Units of Production) Order 1991 SI 1991/1888
Human Fertilisation and Embryology Authority (Licence Committees and Appeals) Regulations 1991 SI 1991/1889
Education (Financial Delegation for Primary Schools) Regulations 1991 SI 1991/1890
Gaming (Records of Cheques) (Amendment) Regulations 1991 SI 1991/1892
Restrictive Trade Practices (Standards and Arrangements) (Goods) Order 1991 SI 1991/1896
Restrictive Trade Practices (Standards and Arrangements) (Services) Order 1991 SI 1991/1897
Trade Marks and Service Marks (Fees) Rules 1991 SI 1991/1898
Housing (Change of Landlord) (Payment of Disposal Cost by Instalments) (Amendment) Regulations 1991 SI 1991/1899

1901-2000
Law Reform (Miscellaneous Provisions) (Scotland) Act 1990 (Commencement No.7) Order 1991 SI 1991/1903
Civil Legal Aid (Scotland) Amendment (No. 2) Regulations 1991 SI 1991/1904
Soft Fruit Plants (Scotland) Order 1991 SI 1991/1905
Agriculture (Power Take-off) (Amendment) Regulations 1991 SI 1991/1913
Notification of New Substances (Amendment) Regulations 1991 SI 1991/1914
Act of Sederunt (Rules of the Court of Session Amendment No.8) (Discharge of Judicial Factors) 1991 SI 1991/1915
Act of Adjournal (Consolidation Amendment No. 2) (Evidence of Children) 1991 SI 1991/1916
Combined Probation Areas (Hampshire) Order 1991 SI 1991/1917
Act of Sederunt (Proceedings in the Sheriff Court under the Debtors (Scotland) Act 1987) (Amendment) 1991 SI 1991/1920
Health and Safety (Fees) Regulations 1991 SI 1991/1921
Offshore Installations (Safety Zones) (No. 3) Order 1991 SI 1991/1922
Magistrates' Courts (Detention and Forfeiture of Drug Trafficking Cash) Rules 1991 SI 1991/1923
Legal Aid Act 1988 (Children Act 1989) Order 1991 SI 1991/1924
Legal Aid in Criminal and Care Proceedings (General) (Amendment) (No.2) Regulations 1991 SI 1991/1925
Domestic Property (Valuation) Regulations 1991 SI 1991/1934
Social Security (Contributions) Amendment (No. 5) Regulations 1991 SI 1991/1935
Agricultural Mortgage Corporation (Specified Day for Repeals) Order 1991 SI 1991/1937
Social Security (Industrial Injuries) (Prescribed Diseases) Amendment Regulations 1991 SI 1991/1938
Protection from Eviction (Excluded Licences) Order 1991 SI 1991/1943
Food Protection (Emergency Prohibitions) (Poisonous Substances in Cattle) (Wales) (Revocation) Order 1991 SI 1991/1944
Land Registration Fees Order 1991 SI 1991/1948
Consumer Credit (Exempt Agreements) (Amendment) (No. 2) Order 1991 SI 1991/1949
Social Security (Adjudication) Amendment (No. 2) Regulations 1991 SI 1991/1950
Gipsy Encampments (District of Corby) Order 1991 SI 1991/1951
Food Protection (Emergency Prohibitions) (Paralytic Shellfish Poisoning) (No.10) Order 1991 SI 1991/1958
Pilotage Act 1987 (Cessation of Temporary Arbitration Procedure) Order and Regulations 1991 SI 1991/1959
Police (Promotion) (Amendment) Regulations 1991 SI 1991/1961
Leicester North Station Light Railway Order 1991 SI 1991/1965
Justices of the Peace (Size and Chairmanship of Bench) (Amendment) Rules 1991 SI 1991/1966
Goods Vehicles (Operators' Licences, Qualifications and Fees) (Amendment) Regulations 1991 SI 1991/1969
Motor Vehicles (Type Approval for Goods Vehicles) (Great Britain) (Amendment) (No.2) Regulations 1991 SI 1991/1970
Motor Vehicles (Type Approval) (Great Britain) (Amendment) (No.2) Regulations 1991 SI 1991/1971
Barnet (Prescribed Route) (No. 3) Traffic Order 1970 (Variation) Order 1991 SI 1991/1972
Education (Grant) (Amendment) Regulations 1991 SI 1991/1975
Education (Higher Education Corporations) (Wales) Order 1991 SI 1991/1976
Public Telecommunication System Designation (Diamond Cable (Grantham) Limited) Order 1991 SI 1991/1977
Scottish Agricultural Securities Corporation (Specified Day for Repeals) Order 1991 SI 1991/1978
Motor Vehicles (Designation of Approval Marks) (Amendment) Regulations 1991 SI 1991/1979
Telford Development Corporation (Transfer of Property and Dissolution) Order 1991 SI 1991/1980
Adopted Persons (Birth Records) Regulations 1991 SI 1991/1981
Foreign Fields (Specification) Order 1991 SI 1991/1982
Foreign Fields (Specification) (No. 2) Order 1991 SI 1991/1983
Foreign Fields (Specification) (No. 3) Order 1991 SI 1991/1984
Children Act 1989 (Commencement No. 2—Amendment and Transitional Provisions) Order 1991 SI 1991/1990
Family Proceedings Courts (Matrimonial Proceedings etc.) Rules 1991 SI 1991/1991
Blue Eared Pig Disease (Amendment) Order 1991 SI 1991/1992
Set-Aside (Amendment) Regulations 1991 SI 1991/1993
Milk Quota (Calculation of Standard Quota) (Amendment) Order 1991 SI 1991/1994
Employment Action (Miscellaneous Provisions) Order 1991 SI 1991/1995
Companies Act 1989 (Commencement No. 12 and Transitional Provision) Order 1991 SI 1991/1996
Companies Act 1989 (Eligibility for Appointment as Company Auditor) (Consequential Amendments) Regulations 1991 SI 1991/1997
Companies (Inspection and Copying of Registers, Indices and Documents) Regulations 1991 SI 1991/1998
Insurance Companies Regulations 1981 (Amendment) Regulations 1991 SI 1991/1999
Official Listing of Securities (Change of Competent Authority) Regulations 1991 SI 1991/2000

2001-2100
National Health Service Supplies Authority (Establishment and Constitution) Order 1991 SI 1991/2001
National Health Service Supplies Authority Regulations 1991 SI 1991/2002
Road Vehicles (Construction and Use) (Amendment) (No. 3) Regulations 1991 SI 1991/2003
Road Traffic Accidents (Payments for Treatment) Order 1991 SI 1991/2005
Local Government Act 1988 (Defined Activities) (Competition) (England) (Amendment) Regulations 1991 SI 1991/2006
River Tweed (Baits and Lures) Regulations 1991 SI 1991/2007
Tendring Hundred Waterworks Company (Constitution and Regulation) Order 1991 SI 1991/2018
Weighing Equipment (Non-automatic Weighing Machines) (Amendment) Regulations 1991 SI 1991/2019
Food Protection (Emergency Prohibitions) (Paralytic Shellfish Poisoning) (No. 11) Order 1991 SI 1991/2020
Extension of the Vehicles (Excise) Act 1971 to Northern Ireland (Commencement) Order 1991 SI 1991/2021
Domestic Property (Valuation) (Scotland) Regulations 1991 SI 1991/2022
Adoption Allowance Regulations 1991 SI 1991/2030
Children and Young Persons (Designation of Isle of Man Orders) Order 1991 SI 1991/2031
Children (Prescribed Orders — Northern Ireland, Guernsey and Isle of Man) Regulations 1991 SI 1991/2032
Children (Representations, Placements and Reviews) (Miscellaneous Amendments) Regulations 1991 SI 1991/2033
Children (Secure Accommodation) (No. 2) Regulations 1991 SI 1991/2034
Probation (Amendment) Rules 1991 SI 1991/2035
Civil Legal Aid (General) (Amendment) (No. 2) Regulations 1991 SI 1991/2036
Legal Aid in Criminal and Care Proceedings (Costs) (Amendment) (No. 3) Regulations 1991 SI 1991/2037
Legal Aid in Family Proceedings (Remuneration) Regulations 1991 SI 1991/2038
National Health Service (Determination of Districts) (No. 2) Order 1991 SI 1991/2039
National Health Service (District Health Authorities) (No. 2) Order 1991 SI 1991/2040
Regional and District Health Authorities (Membership and Procedure) Amendment (No.2) Regulations 1991 SI 1991/2041
Maintenance Enforcement Act 1991 (Commencement No. 1) Order 1991 SI 1991/2042
Gaming (Records of Cheques) (Scotland) (Amendment) Regulations 1991 SI 1991/2047
Petty Sessional Divisions (Devon) Order 1991 SI 1991/2048
A11 Trunk Road (Four Went Ways to Newmarket Dualling) Slip Roads Order 1991 SI 1991/2049
Children (Private Arrangements for Fostering) Regulations 1991 SI 1991/2050
Guardians Ad Litem and Reporting Officers (Panels) Regulations 1991 SI 1991/2051
Housing (Right to Buy) (Priority of Charges) (No. 2) Order 1991 SI 1991/2052
Mortgage Indemnities (Recognised Bodies) Order 1991 SI 1991/2053
Road Traffic Act 1991 (Commencement No. 1) Order 1991 SI 1991/2054
Medicines (Fees Relating to Medicinal Products for Animal Use) (Amendment) Regulations 1991 SI 1991/2063
Planning and Compensation Act 1991 (Commencement No.1 and Transitional Provisions) Order 1991 SI 1991/2067
Taxes (Interest Rate) (Amendment No. 5) Regulations 1991 SI 1991/2070
Child Minding and Day Care (Registration and Inspection Fees) Regulations 1991 SI 1991/2076
Food Protection (Emergency Prohibitions) (Paralytic Shellfish Poisoning) (No. 12) Order 1991 SI 1991/2077
Food Protection (Emergency Prohibitions) (Paralytic Shellfish Poisoning) (No. 7 and No. 10) Orders 1991 Revocation Order 1991 SI 1991/2078
Cod and Sole (Specified Sea Areas) (Prohibition of Fishing) Order 1991 SI 1991/2085
Building Societies (Accounts and Related Provisions) (Amendment) Regulations 1991 SI 1991/2086
Excise Duties (Goods Imported for Testing, etc.) Relief Order 1991 SI 1991/2089
Planning and Compensation Act 1991 (Commencement No. 2 and Transitional Provisions) (Scotland) Order 1991 SI 1991/2092
Fees in the Registers of Scotland Order 1991 SI 1991/2093
Disqualification for Caring for Children Regulations 1991 SI 1991/2094
M25 Motorway (A13 to A12 Section) (Mar Dyke Connecting Roads) Scheme 1975 and the M25 Motorway (A13 to A12 Section and Connecting Roads) Scheme 1975, Variation Scheme 1991 SI 1991/2095
Magistrates' Courts (Costs Against Legal Representatives in Civil Proceedings) Rules 1991 SI 1991/2096
Packaging of Explosives for Carriage Regulations 1991 SI 1991/2097
Agricultural or Forestry Tractors and Tractor Components (Type Approval) (Fees) Regulations 1991 SI 1991/2098
Juvenile Courts (Constitution) (Amendment) Rules 1991 SI 1991/2099

2101-2200
Child Benefit (General) Amendment Regulations 1991 SI 1991/2105
Criminal Justice (International Co-operation) Act 1990 (Commencement No. 2) Order 1991 SI 1991/2108
Non-Domestic Rating (Payment of Interest) (Amendment) Regulations 1991 SI 1991/2111
Legal Aid in Family Proceedings (Remuneration) (Amendment) Regulations 1991 SI 1991/2112
Family Proceedings (Amendment) Rules 1991 SI 1991/2113
Family Proceedings Fees Order 1991 SI 1991/2114
Annual Close Time (River Nairn Salmon Fishery District) Order 1991 SI 1991/2115
Broadcasting (Foreign Satellite Programmes) (Specified Countries) Order 1991 SI 1991/2124
Road Vehicles (Construction and Use) (Amendment) (No. 4) Regulations 1991 SI 1991/2125
Food Protection (Emergency Prohibitions) (Paralytic Shellfish Poisoning) (No.8) Order 1991 Revocation Order 1991 SI 1991/2126
Companies Act 1985 (Disclosure of Remuneration for Non-Audit Work) Regulations 1991 SI 1991/2128
Child Minding and Day Care (Applications for Registration and Inspection Fees) (Amendment) Regulations 1991 SI 1991/2129
Adoption Allowance (Amendment) Regulations 1991 SI 1991/2130
 The Stroud (Parishes) (No. 2) Order 1990 S.I. 1991/2133
Bure Valley Railway Light Railway (Amendment) Order 1991 SI 1991/2136
Public Telecommunication System Designation (Broadland Cablevision Limited) Order 1991 SI 1991/2141
Public Telecommunication System Designation (Kirklees Cable) Order 1991 SI 1991/2142
Public Telecommunication System Designation (Stafford Communications Limited) Order 1991 SI 1991/2143
Merchant Shipping (Crew Agreements, Lists of Crew and Discharge of Seamen) Regulations 1991 SI 1991/2144
Merchant Shipping (Official Log Books) (Amendment) Regulations 1991 SI 1991/2145
Local Government (Assistants for Political Groups) (Remuneration) Order 1991 SI 1991/2150
Law Reform (Miscellaneous Provisions) (Scotland) Act 1990 (Commencement No. 8) Order 1991 SI 1991/2151
Assignation Statement (Prescribed Information) (Scotland) Regulations 1991 SI 1991/2152
Agricultural Holdings (Specification of Forms) (Scotland) Order 1991 SI 1991/2154
Education (South West London College Higher Education Corporation) (Dissolution) Order 1991 SI 1991/2155
Banking Act 1987 (Exempt Transactions) (Amendment No. 2) Regulations 1991 SI 1991/2168
Education (National Curriculum) (Assessment Arrangements for English, Mathematics and Science) (Key Stage 1) Order 1991 SI 1991/2169
Education (National Curriculum) (Assessment Arrangements for Technology) (Key Stage 1) Order 1991 SI 1991/2170
 The Cotswold (Parishes) Order 1991 S.I. 1991/2171
A12 Trunk Road (Eastern Avenue, Redbridge) (Prescribed Routes) Order 1991 SI 1991/2172
Companies Act 1989 (Commencement No. 13) Order 1991 SI 1991/2173
Amusements with Prizes (Variation of Fees) Order 1991 SI 1991/2174
Betting, Gaming and Lotteries Act 1963 (Variation of Fees) Order 1991 SI 1991/2175
Betting, Gaming and Lotteries Act 1963 (Variation of Fees) (No. 2) Order 1991 SI 1991/2176
Gaming Act (Variation of Fees) (No. 2) Order 1991 SI 1991/2177
Lotteries (Registration Authority Fees) Order 1991 SI 1991/2178
A13 Trunk Road (Ripple Road, Barking and Dagenham) (Prescribed Routes) Order 1991 SI 1991/2180
Natural Heritage (Scotland) Act 1991 (Commencement No. 1) Order 1991 SI 1991/2187
Broadcasting (Local Delivery Services) (Amendment) Order 1991 SI 1991/2188
River Cree Salmon Fishery District (Baits and Lures) Regulations 1991 SI 1991/2192
Kirklees Light Railway Order 1991 SI 1991/2194
Finance Act 1985 (Interest on Tax) (Prescribed Rate) (No. 4) Order 1991 SI 1991/2195
Sea Fish Licensing (Variation) Order 1991 SI 1991/2196
Fertilisers Regulations 1991 SI 1991/2197
Hops Certification (Amendment) Regulations 1991 SI 1991/2198

2201-2300
Act of Sederunt (Rules for the Registration of Custody Orders of the Sheriff Court) (Amendment) 1991 SI 1991/2205
Seed Potatoes Regulations 1991 SI 1991/2206
Criminal Justice Act 1991 (Commencement No. 1) Order 1991 SI 1991/2208
Grimsby and Louth Light Railway Order 1991 SI 1991/2210
Civil Courts (Amendment No. 2) Order 1991 SI 1991/2211
Petty Sessional Divisions (Cheshire) Order 1991 SI 1991/2212
Act of Sederunt (Rules of the Court of Session Amendment No.9) (International Commercial Arbitration) 1991 SI 1991/2213
Act of Sederunt (Proceedings in the Sheriff Court under the Model Law on International Commercial Arbitration) 1991 SI 1991/2214
Petty Sessional Divisions (Cambridgeshire) Order 1991 SI 1991/2215
Motor Vehicles (Tests) (Amendment) (No. 4) Regulations 1991 SI 1991/2229
Dairy Produce Quotas Regulations 1991 SI 1991/2232
Rivers Tweed and Eye Protection (Renewal) Order 1991 SI 1991/2234
River Tummel Catchment Area Protection (Renewal) Order 1991 SI 1991/2235
River Lunan Catchment Area Protection (Renewal) Order 1991 SI 1991/2236
Design Right (Semiconductor Topographies) (Amendment) Regulations 1991 SI 1991/2237
Social Fund Cold Weather Payments (General) Amendment No.2 Regulations 1991 SI 1991/2238
Goods Vehicles (Operators' Licences, Qualifications and Fees) (Amendment) (No. 2) Regulations 1991 SI 1991/2239
Education (Teachers) (Amendment) (No. 3) Regulations 1991 SI 1991/2240
National Health Service (General Medical and Pharmaceutical Services) (Scotland) Amendment (No.2) Regulations 1991 SI 1991/2241
Beef Carcase (Classification) Regulations 1991 SI 1991/2242
A406 London North Circular Trunk Road (East London River Crossing (A13 to A2) No. 2 Bridge) Order 1991 SI 1991/2244
A406 London North Circular Trunk Road (East London River Crossing (A13 to A2) Slip Roads) Order 1991 SI 1991/2245
Bovine Spongiform Encephalopathy Order 1991 SI 1991/2246
Dorset, Hampshire, West Sussex and Wiltshire (County Boundaries) Order 1991 SI 1991/2247
Charging Authorities (Notification of Precept Population) (Wales) (Amendment) (No. 2) Regulations 1991 SI 1991/2259
Charging Authorities (Population for Precepts) (Wales) (Amendment) (No.2) Regulations 1991 SI 1991/2260
National Health Service (General Medical and Pharmaceutical Services) Amendment Regulations 1991 SI 1991/2263
Town and Country Planning General Development (Amendment) (No. 2) Order 1991 SI 1991/2268
Skye Salmon Fishery District Designation Order 1991 SI 1991/2271
Planning and Compensation Act 1991 (Commencement No. 3) Order 1991 SI 1991/2272
Occupational Pension Schemes (Miscellaneous Amendments) Regulations 1991 SI 1991/2273
Registration of Births and Deaths (Amendment) Regulations 1991 SI 1991/2275
A41 London–Birmingham Trunk Road (Aston Clinton Bypass and Slip Roads) Order 1991 SI 1991/2280
A41 London–Birmingham Trunk Road (East of Aylesbury to West of Tring) Detrunking Order 1991 SI 1991/2281
Value Added Tax Act 1983 (Interest on Overpayments etc.) (Prescribed Rate) (No. 2) Order 1991 SI 1991/2282
 The Forest of Dean (Parishes) Order 1991 S.I. 1991/2283
Social Security (Miscellaneous Provisions) Amendment Regulations 1991 SI 1991/2284
Water (Prevention of Pollution) (Code of Practice) Order 1991 SI 1991/2285
New Roads and Street Works Act 1991 (Commencement No. 1) (Scotland) Order 1991 SI 1991/2286
New Roads and Street Works Act 1991 (Commencement No. 1) Order 1991 SI 1991/2288
European Communities (Designation) (No. 3) Order 1991 SI 1991/2289
Arms Control and Disarmament (Inspections) (Sovereign Base Areas of Akrotiri and Dhekelia) Order 1991 SI 1991/2290
Consular Fees (Amendment) (No.2) Order 1991 SI 1991/2291
Dangerous Dogs (Northern Ireland) Order 1991 SI 1991/2292
Friendly Societies Act 1984 (Guernsey) Order 1991 SI 1991/2293
Social Security (Contributions)(Northern Ireland) Order 1991 SI 1991/2294
Access to Health Records (Steps to Secure Compliance and Complaints Procedures) (Scotland) Regulations 1991 SI 1991/2295
Local Government Reorganisation (Consequential Provision) Order 1991 SI 1991/2296
Dangerous Dogs Compensation and Exemption Schemes (Amendment) Order 1991 SI 1991/2297

2301-2400
Legal Advice and Assistance (Amendment) (No. 2) Regulations 1991 SI 1991/2305
Value Added Tax (Input Tax) (Person Supplied) Order 1991 SI 1991/2306
Education (Polytechnics and Colleges Funding Council) (Prescribed Expenditure) Regulations 1991 SI 1991/2307
Milk Quota (Calculation of Standard Quota) (Scotland) Amendment Order 1991 SI 1991/2309
Value Added Tax (General) (Amendment) (No. 3) Regulations 1991 SI 1991/2312
Bristol Waterworks Company (Constitution and Regulation) Order 1991 SI 1991/2313
Aintree Hospitals National Health Service Trust (Establishment) Order 1991 SI 1991/2316
Airedale National Health Service Trust (Establishment) Order 1991 SI 1991/2317
Allington National Health Service Trust (Establishment) Order 1991 SI 1991/2318
Ashford Hospitals National Health Service Trust (Establishment) Order 1991 SI 1991/2319
Avon Ambulance Service National Health Service Trust (Establishment) Order 1991 SI 1991/2320
Aylesbury Vale Community Healthcare National Health Service Trust (Establishment) Order 1991 SI 1991/2321
Barnet Community Healthcare National Health Service Trust (Establishment) Order 1991 SI 1991/2322
Barnsley Community and Priority Services National Health Service Trust (Establishment) Order 1991 SI 1991/2323
Barts National Health Service Trust (Establishment) Order 1991 SI 1991/2324
Basildon and Thurrock General Hospitals National Health Service Trust (Establishment) Order 1991 SI 1991/2325
Bassetlaw Hospital and Community Services National Health Service Trust (Establishment) Order 1991 SI 1991/2326
Bath and West Community National Health Service Trust (Establishment) Order 1991 SI 1991/2327
Bath Mental Health Care National Health Service Trust (Establishment) Order 1991 SI 1991/2328
Bedford Hospital National Health Service Trust (Establishment) Order 1991 SI 1991/2329
Bradford Community Health National Health Service Trust (Establishment) Order 1991 SI 1991/2330
Burnley Health Care National Health Service Trust (Establishment) Order 1991 SI 1991/2331
Central Sheffield University Hospitals National Health Service Trust (Establishment) Order 1991 SI 1991/2332
Clatterbridge Centre for Oncology National Health Service Trust (Establishment) Order 1991 SI 1991/2333
Income Support (General) Amendment No.6 Regulations 1991 SI 1991/2334
Cleveland Ambulance National Health Service Trust (Establishment) Order 1991 SI 1991/2335
Dacorum and St Albans Community National Health Service Trust (Establishment) Order 1991 SI 1991/2336
Devon Ambulance Service National Health Service Trust (Establishment) Order 1991 SI 1991/2337
Doncaster Healthcare National Health Service Trust (Establishment) Order 1991 SI 1991/2338
Dorset Health Care National Health Service Trust (Establishment) Order 1991 SI 1991/2339
Ealing Hospital National Health Service Trust (Establishment) Order 1991 SI 1991/2340
East Berkshire National Health Service Trust for People with Learning Disabilities (Establishment) Order 1991 SI 1991/2341
East Birmingham Hospital National Health Service Trust (Establishment) Order 1991 SI 1991/2342
East Hertfordshire Health National Health Service Trust (Establishment) Order 1991 SI 1991/2343
Eastbourne Hospitals National Health Service Trust (Establishment) Order 1991 SI 1991/2344
Essex Ambulance Service National Health Service Trust (Establishment) Order 1991 SI 1991/2345
Essex Rivers Healthcare National Health Service Trust (Establishment) Order 1991 SI 1991/2346
Exeter and District Community Health Service National Health Service Trust (Establishment) Order 1991 SI 1991/2347
Forest Healthcare National Health Service Trust (Establishment) Order 1991 SI 1991/2348
Frenchay Healthcare National Health Service Trust (Establishment) Order 1991 SI 1991/2349
Frimley Park Hospital National Health Service Trust (Establishment) Order 1991 SI 1991/2350
Gateshead Community Health National Health Service Trust (Establishment) Order 1991 SI 1991/2351
Gloucestershire Ambulance Service National Health Service Trust (Establishment) Order 1991 SI 1991/2352
Harefield Hospital National Health Service Trust (Establishment) Order 1991 SI 1991/2353
Harrogate Health Care National Health Service Trust (Establishment) Order 1991 SI 1991/2354
Harrow Community Health Services National Health Service Trust (Establishment) Order 1991 SI 1991/2355
Hastings and Rother National Health Service Trust (Establishment) Order 1991 SI 1991/2356
Heatherwood and Wexham Park Hospitals' National Health Service Trust (Establishment) Order 1991 SI 1991/2357
Herefordshire Community Health National Health Service Trust (Establishment) Order 1991 SI 1991/2358
Hillingdon Community Health National Health Service Trust (Establishment) Order 1991 SI 1991/2359
Hinchingbrooke Health Care National Health Service Trust (Establishment) Order 1991 SI 1991/2360
Horizon National Health Service Trust (Establishment) Order 1991 SI 1991/2361
King's Healthcare National Health Service Trust (Establishment) Order 1991 SI 1991/2362
King's Lynn and Wisbech Hospitals National Health Service Trust (Establishment) Order 1991 SI 1991/2363
Lancaster Acute Hospitals National Health Service Trust (Establishment) Order 1991 SI 1991/2364
Lancaster Priority Services National Health Service Trust (Establishment) Order 1991 SI 1991/2365
Liverpool Obstetric and Gynaecology Services National Health Service Trust (Establishment) Order 1991 SI 1991/2366
Luton and Dunstable Hospital Trust National Health Service Trust (Establishment) Order 1991 SI 1991/2367
Maidstone Priority Care National Health Service Trust (Establishment) Order 1991 SI 1991/2368
Mersey Regional Ambulance Service National Health Service Trust (Establishment) Order 1991 SI 1991/2369
Mid Essex Hospital Services National Health Service Trust (Establishment) Order 1991 SI 1991/2370
Milton Keynes Community Health National Health Service Trust (Establishment) Order 1991 SI 1991/2371
Milton Keynes General National Health Service Trust (Establishment) Order 1991 SI 1991/2372
Mulberry National Health Service Trust (Establishment) Order 1991 SI 1991/2373
New Possibilities National Health Service Trust (Establishment) Order 1991 SI 1991/2374
North East Essex Mental Health National Health Service Trust (Establishment) Order 1991 SI 1991/2375
North Mersey Community National Health Service Trust (Establishment) Order 1991 SI 1991/2376
North Tees Health National Health Service Trust (Establishment) Order 1991 SI 1991/2377
Northallerton Health Services National Health Service Trust (Establishment) Order 1991 SI 1991/2378
Northgate National Health Service Trust (Establishment) Order 1991 SI 1991/2379
Nottingham City Hospital National Health Service Trust (Establishment) Order 1991 SI 1991/2380
Nottingham Community Health National Health Service Trust (Establishment) Order 1991 SI 1991/2381
Oldham National Health Service Trust (Establishment) Order 1991 SI 1991/2382
Optimum Health Services National Health Service Trust (Establishment) Order 1991 SI 1991/2383
Parkside National Health Service Trust (Establishment) Order 1991 SI 1991/2384
Phoenix National Health Service Trust (Establishment) Order 1991 SI 1991/2385
Plymouth Community Services National Health Service Trust (Establishment) Order 1991 SI 1991/2386
Poole Hospital National Health Service Trust (Establishment) Order 1991 SI 1991/2387
Premier Health National Health Service Trust (Establishment) Order 1991 SI 1991/2388
Ravensbourne Priority Health National Health Service Trust (Establishment) Order 1991 SI 1991/2389
Royal Bournemouth and Christchurch Hospitals National Health Service Trust (Establishment) Order 1991 SI 1991/2390
Royal Cornwall Hospitals and West Cornwall Hospital National Health Service Trust (Establishment) Order 1991 SI 1991/2391
Royal United Hospital, Bath, National Health Service Trust (Establishment) Order 1991 SI 1991/2392
Royal Victoria Infirmary and Associated Hospitals National Health Service Trust (Establishment) Order 1991 SI 1991/2393
St Helens and Knowsley Community Health National Health Service Trust (Establishment) Order 1991 SI 1991/2394
St Mary's National Health Service Trust (Establishment) Order 1991 SI 1991/2395
St Peter's Hospital National Health Service Trust (Establishment) Order 1991 SI 1991/2396
St Thomas' Hospital National Health Service Trust (Establishment) Order 1991 SI 1991/2397
Scarborough and North East Yorkshire Health Care National Health Service Trust (Establishment) Order 1991 SI 1991/2398
Sheffield Children's Hospital National Health Service Trust (Establishment) Order 1991 SI 1991/2399
South Bedfordshire Community Health Care National Health Service Trust (Establishment) Order 1991 SI 1991/2400

2401-2500
South Downs Health National Health Service Trust (Establishment) Order 1991 SI 1991/2401
South Tees Acute Hospitals National Health Service Trust (Establishment) Order 1991 SI 1991/2402
South Warwickshire Health Care National Health Service Trust (Establishment) Order 1991 SI 1991/2403
South Yorkshire Metropolitan Ambulance and Paramedic Service National Health Service Trust (Establishment) Order 1991 SI 1991/2404
Southend Community Care Services National Health Service Trust (Establishment) Order 1991 SI 1991/2405
Southmead Health Services National Health Service Trust (Establishment) Order 1991 SI 1991/2406
Southport and Formby National Health Service Trust (Establishment) Order 1991 SI 1991/2407
Staffordshire Ambulance Service National Health Service Trust (Establishment) Order 1991 SI 1991/2408
Thameslink Healthcare Services National Health Service Trust (Establishment) Order 1991 SI 1991/2409
Walsgrave Hospital National Health Service Trust (Establishment) Order 1991 SI 1991/2410
Walton Centre for Neurology and Neurosurgery National Health Service Trust (Establishment) Order 1991 SI 1991/2411
Wellhouse National Health Service Trust (Establishment) Order 1991 SI 1991/2412
West Lambeth Community Care National Health Service Trust (Establishment) Order 1991 SI 1991/2413
Weston Park Hospital National Health Service Trust (Establishment) Order 1991 SI 1991/2414
Weybourne Community National Health Service Trust (Establishment) Order 1991 SI 1991/2415
Wiltshire Health Care National Health Service Trust (Establishment) Order 1991 SI 1991/2416
Wrightington Hospital National Health Service Trust (Establishment) Order 1991 SI 1991/2417
York Health Services National Health Service Trust (Establishment) Order 1991 SI 1991/2418
Pensions Increase (Approved Schemes) (National Health Service) Amendment Regulations 1991 SI 1991/2419
Export and Investment Guarantees Act 1991 (Commencement) Order 1991 SI 1991/2430
Control of Substances Hazardous to Health (Amendment) Regulations 1991 SI 1991/2431
(A6) London–Carlisle Trunk Road and the (A46) Bath–Lincoln Trunk Road (Leicester Western Bypass) (Detrunking) Order 1991 SI 1991/2432
(M1) London–Yorkshire Motorway (A46 Leicester Western Bypass) Connecting Roads (Supplementary) Scheme 1991 SI 1991/2433
(A46) Bath–Lincoln Trunk Road (Leicester Western Bypass and Slip Roads) (Supplementary) Order 1991 SI 1991/2434
(A46) Bath–Lincoln Trunk Road (Leicester Western Bypass and Slip Roads) Order 1991 SI 1991/2435
Rules of the Air Regulations 1991 SI 1991/2437
Local Government Act 1988 (Defined Activities) (Exemption) (England) (No.2) Order 1991 SI 1991/2438
Social Fund Cold Weather Payments (General) Amendment No. 3 Regulations 1991 SI 1991/2448
Fees for Cinema Licences (Variation) Order 1991 SI 1991/2462
South Staffordshire Waterworks Company (Constitution and Regulation) Order 1991 SI 1991/2463
Derbyshire and Greater Manchester (County Boundaries) Order 1991 SI 1991/2464
National Health Service (Optical Charges and Payments) Amendment (No. 2) Regulations 1991 SI 1991/2465
Local Government Superannuation (Interchange) Regulations 1991 SI 1991/2471
Blood Tests (Evidence of Paternity) (Amendment) (No. 3) Regulations 1991 SI 1991/2472
Food Protection (Emergency Prohibitions) (Paralytic Shellfish Poisoning) (No.12 Partial Revocation) Order 1991 SI 1991/2482
Act of Sederunt (Rules of the Court of Session Amendment No.10) (Miscellaneous) 1991 SI 1991/2483
Police (Amendment) Regulations 1991 SI 1991/2484
Imported Food and Feedingstuffs (Safeguards against Cholera) Regulations 1991 SI 1991/2486
National Health Service (Optical Charges and Payments) (Scotland) Amendment (No.2) Regulations 1991 SI 1991/2487
Criminal Procedure (Insanity and Unfitness to Plead) Act 1991 (Commencement) Order 1991 SI 1991/2488
Electricity (Non-Fossil Fuel Sources) (England and Wales) Order 1991 SI 1991/2490
Motor Vehicles (Driving Licences) (Heavy Goods and Public Service Vehicles) (Amendment) Regulations 1991 SI 1991/2491
Motor Vehicles (Driving Licences) (Large Goods and Passenger-Carrying Vehicles) (Amendment) (No. 4) Regulations 1991 SI 1991/2492
Motor Vehicles (Driving Licences) (Amendment) (No. 3) Regulations 1991 SI 1991/2493
Hampshire and Surrey (County Boundaries) Order 1991 SI 1991/2494
Betting, Gaming and Lotteries Act 1963 (Variation of Fees) (Scotland) Order 1991 SI 1991/2495
Betting, Gaming and Lotteries Act 1963 (Variation of Fees) (Scotland) (No.2) Order 1991 SI 1991/2496
Amusements with Prizes (Variation of Fees) (Scotland) Order 1991 SI 1991/2497
Lotteries (Registration Authority Fees) (Scotland) Order 1991 SI 1991/2498
Gaming Act (Variation of Fees) (Scotland) (No.2) Order 1991 SI 1991/2499
Children and Young Persons (Protection from Tobacco) Act 1991 (Commencement No. 1) Order 1991 SI 1991/2500

2501-2600
Combined Probation Areas (Devon) Order 1991 SI 1991/2501
Residential Care Homes (Amendment) Regulations 1991 SI 1991/2502
Value Added Tax (Special Provisions) (Amendment) Order 1991 SI 1991/2503
 The South Bucks (Parishes) Order 1991 S.I. 1991/2504
Social Security (Contributions) Amendment (No. 6) Regulations 1991 SI 1991/2505
Croydon Community National Health Service Trust (Transfer of Trust Property) Order 1991 SI 1991/2507
Coal Mining Subsidence Act 1991 (Commencement) Order 1991 SI 1991/2508
Coal Mining Subsidence (Notices and Claims) Regulations 1991 SI 1991/2509
Coal Mining Subsidence (Preventive Measures and Rates of Interest) Order 1991 SI 1991/2510
Insurance Companies (Linked Contracts) (Amendment) Regulations 1991 SI 1991/2511
Ancient Monuments (Claims for Compensation) (England) Regulations 1991 SI 1991/2512
Collieston Harbour Revision Order 1991 SI 1991/2513
Local Government Superannuation (Miscellaneous Provisions) Regulations 1991 SI 1991/2522
Import and Export (Plant Health Fees) (Forestry) (Great Britain) (Amendment) Order 1991 SI 1991/2523
Mining Industry Act 1926 (Metrication) Regulations 1991 SI 1991/2531
Nursing Homes and Mental Nursing Homes (Amendment) Regulations 1991 SI 1991/2532
Value Added Tax (Piped Gas) (Metrication) Order 1991 SI 1991/2534
Value Added Tax (Small Non-Commercial Consignments) Relief (Amendment) Order 1991 SI 1991/2535
Control of Pollution (Radioactive Waste) (Scotland) Regulations 1991 SI 1991/2539
Antioxidants in Food (Amendment) Regulations 1991 SI 1991/2540
Lifecare National Health Service Trust (Transfer of Trust Property) Order 1991 SI 1991/2541
Neath–Abergavenny Trunk Road (A465) (Improvement from Aberdulais to Glynneath and Slip Roads) Order 1991 SI 1991/2542
Merchant Shipping (Load Lines) Act 1967 (Unregistered Ships) Order 1991 SI 1991/2543
Local Government Act 1988 (Defined Activities) (Competition and Specified Periods) (Scotland) Amendment Regulations 1991 SI 1991/2548
A2 Trunk Road (Old Dover Road, Barham) Detrunking Order 1991 SI 1991/2550
A435 Trunk Road (Norton–Lenchwick Bypass) Order 1991 SI 1991/2551
A435 Trunk Road (South of Norton to Arrow) De-Trunking Order 1991 SI 1991/2552
A422 Trunk Road (South of Alcester) De-Trunking Order 1991 SI 1991/2553
Bolton, Bury and Salford (District Boundaries) Order 1991 SI 1991/2555
Education (National Curriculum) (Attainment Targets and Programmes of Study in Geography) (England) (No. 2) Order 1991 SI 1991/2562
Education (National Curriculum) (Attainment Targets and Programmes of Study in Modern Foreign Languages) Order 1991 SI 1991/2563
Spirits Regulations 1991 SI 1991/2564
Sea Fishing (Specified Western Waters) (Restrictions on Landing) (Variation) Order 1991 SI 1991/2565
Insurance Brokers Registration Council (Registration and Enrolment) (Amendment) Rules Approval Order 1991 SI 1991/2566
Education (National Curriculum) (Modern Foreign Languages) Order 1991 SI 1991/2567
Medicines (Veterinary Drugs) (Prescription Only) (Amendment) Order 1991 SI 1991/2568
Value Added Tax (Buildings and Land) Order 1991 SI 1991/2569
Electrical Equipment for Explosive Atmospheres (Certification) (Amendment) Regualtions 1991 SI 1991/2570
International Carriage of Perishable Foodstuffs (Amendment) (No. 3) Regulations 1991 SI 1991/2571
Water Byelaws (Milngavie Waterworks, Loch Katrine, Loch Arklet, Glen Finglas) Extension Order 1991 SI 1991/2573
 The Derbyshire Dales (Parishes) Order 1991 S.I. 1991/2574
 The Doncaster (Parishes) Order 1991 S.I. 1991/2575
Electricity (Scottish Electricity Companies) (Target Investment Limits) Order 1991 SI 1991/2579
Building Societies (Liquid Asset) Regulations 1991 SI 1991/2580
Building Societies (Designation of Qualifying Bodies) (No.2) Order 1991 SI 1991/2581
Building Societies (Prescribed Contracts) (Amendment) Order 1991 SI 1991/2582
Customs Duties (ECSC) (Amendment No. 6) Order 1991 SI 1991/2583
 The Macclesfield (Parishes) Order 1991 S.I. 1991/2588
Hartlepool (Parishes) Order 1991 SI 1991/2587
Education (Bursaries for Teacher Training) (Amendment) (No. 2) Regulations 1991 SI 1991/2589
 The Pendle (Parishes) Order 1991 S.I. 1991/2590
Dog Racecourse Totalisator (Percentage) Order 1991 SI 1991/2592
Cod and Sole (Specified Sea Areas) (Prohibition of Fishing) (Variation) Order 1991 SI 1991/2593
Folkestone-Honiton Trunk Road (A27 Brighton By-Pass and Slip Roads) Order 1984, Variation Order 1991 SI 1991/2594
 The Mid Devon (Parishes) Order 1991 S.I. 1991/2600

2601-2700
Income Tax (Interest Relief) (Qualifying Lenders) (No. 2) Order 1991 SI 1991/2604
Medicines (Pharmacies) (Applications for Registration and Fees) Amendment Regulations 1991 SI 1991/2605
Occupational Pensions (Revaluation) Order 1991 SI 1991/2606
Act of Sederunt (Access to Health Records Rules) 1991 SI 1991/2607
Education (National Curriculum) (Attainment Targets and Programmes of Study in Geography) (Wales) (Amendment) Order 1991 SI 1991/2608
Sealink (Transfer of Portsmouth Harbour Railway Jetty) Harbour Revision Order 1991 SI 1991/2609
Disability Living Allowance And Disability Working Allowance Act 1991 (Commencement No. 2) Order 1991 SI 1991/2617
Public Lending Right Scheme 1982 (Commencement of Variations) Order 1991 SI 1991/2618
Chester-Bangor Trunk Road (A55) (Aber Improvement and Slip Roads) Order 1991 SI 1991/2622
Local Authorities (Armorial Bearings) Order 1991 SI 1991/2623
Child Abduction and Custody (Parties to Conventions) (Amendment) (No. 3) Order 1991 SI 1991/2624
Arms Control and Disarmament (Inspections) Act 1991 (Guernsey) Order 1991 SI 1991/2625
Arms Control and Disarmament (Inspections) Act 1991 (Isle of Man) Order 1991 SI 1991/2626
Arms Control and Disarmament (Inspections) Act 1991 (Jersey) Order 1991 SI 1991/2627
Child Support(Northern Ireland) Order 1991 SI 1991/2628
Consular Fees (Amendment) (No.3) Order 1991 SI 1991/2629
Immigration (Isle of Man) Order 1991 SI 1991/2630
Judicial Pensions (Northern Ireland) Order 1991 SI 1991/2631
Suckler Cow Premium Regulations 1991 SI 1991/2632
Natural Heritage (Scotland) Act 1991 (Commencement No. 2) Order 1991 SI 1991/2633
Land Registration (District Registries) Order 1991 SI 1991/2634
Agriculture Act 1986 (Commencement No. 5) Order 1991 SI 1991/2635
Dangerous Dogs Compensation and Exemption Schemes (Amendment) (No. 2) Order 1991 SI 1991/2636
Petty Sessional Divisions (Leicestershire) Order 1991 SI 1991/2637
Conservation of Seals (Common Seals) (Shetland Islands Area) Order 1991 SI 1991/2638
Central Regional Council (Gartmorn Reservoir) Byelaws Extension Order 1991 SI 1991/2639
Goods Vehicles (Authorisation of International Journeys) (Fees) (Amendment) Regulations 1991 SI 1991/2646
Ancient Monuments (Claims for Compensation) (Wales) Regulations 1991 SI 1991/2647
Merger Reference (Medicopharma NV and AAH Holdings plc) Order 1991 SI 1991/2648
Prevention of Terrorism (Temporary Provisions) (Designated Ports) Order 1991 SI 1991/2649
Police (Amendment) (No. 2) Regulations 1991 SI 1991/2650
North Yorkshire and West Yorkshire (County and District Boundaries) Order 1991 SI 1991/2651
Act of Sederunt (Rules of the Court of Session Amendment No.11) (Applications under the Access to Health Records Act 1990) 1991 SI 1991/2652
 The Royal Borough of Windsor and Maidenhead (Parishes) Order 1991 S.I. 1991/2660
 The South Somerset (Parishes) Order 1991 S.I. 1991/2661
 The West Lindsey (Parishes) Order 1991 S.I. 1991/2662
Export of Goods (Control) Order 1991 SI 1991/2666
Magistrates' Courts (Remands in Custody) Order 1991 SI 1991/2667
Rainhill Stoops to Queensway Trunk Road (A568 Widnes Eastern Bypass Southern Extension) Order 1991 SI 1991/2668
Offshore Installations (Safety Zones) (No. 4) Order 1991 SI 1991/2669
Rules of the Supreme Court (Amendment No. 4) 1991 SI 1991/2671
Act of Adjournal (Consolidation Amendment No.3) 1991 SI 1991/2676
Act of Adjournal (Consolidation Amendment No. 4) (Supervised Attendance Orders) 1991 SI 1991/2677
Capital Gains Tax (Gilt-edged Securities) Order 1991 SI 1991/2678
Public Supply Contracts Regulations 1991 SI 1991/2679
Public Works Contracts Regulations 1991 SI 1991/2680
Motor Vehicles (Type Approval) (Amendment) (No. 2) Regulations 1991 SI 1991/2681
Saundersfoot Steam Railway (Light Railway)Order 1991 SI 1991/2682
Administration of Justice Act 1985 (Commencement No. 7) Order 1991 SI 1991/2683
Solicitors' Incorporated Practices Order 1991 SI 1991/2684
Housing (Change of Landlord) (Payment of Disposal Cost by Instalments) (Amendment) (No.2) Regulations 1991 SI 1991/2685
Police and Criminal Evidence Act 1984 (Commencement No. 4) Order 1991 SI 1991/2686
Police and Criminal Evidence Act 1984 (Tape-recording of Interviews) (No. 1) Order 1991 SI 1991/2687
Petty Sessional Divisions (Norfolk) Order 1991 SI 1991/2689
Heating Appliances (Fireguards) (Safety) Regulations 1991 SI 1991/2693
Goods Vehicles (Authorisation of International Journeys) (Fees) (Amendment) (No. 2) Regulations 1991 SI 1991/2694
Income-related Benefits Schemes (Miscellaneous Provisions) Amendment Regulations 1991 SI 1991/2695
Goods Vehicles (Operators' Licences)(Temporary Use in Great Britain) (Amendment) Regulations 1991 SI 1991/2696
Pembrokeshire National Health Service Trust (Establishment) Order 1991 SI 1991/2697
Planning (Consequential Provisions) Act 1990 (Appointed Day No. 1 and Transitional Provisions) Order 1991 SI 1991/2698
Tribunals and Inquiries (Specified Tribunals) Order 1991 SI 1991/2699
Gloucestershire Districts (Electoral Arrangements) (Variation) Order 1991 SI 1991/2700

2701-2800
Mid Devon, Torridge and West Devon (District Boundaries) Order 1991 SI 1991/2701
Merger Reference (Medicopharma NV and AAH Holdings plc) (Amendment) Order 1991 SI 1991/2702
Bank Accounts Directive (Miscellaneous Banks) Regulations 1991 SI 1991/2704
Companies Act 1985 (Bank Accounts) Regulations 1991 SI 1991/2705
Criminal Justice Act 1991 (Commencement No. 2 and Transitional Provisions) Order 1991 SI 1991/2706
Social Security (Graduated Retirement Benefit) Amendment Regulations 1991 SI 1991/2707
Disabled Persons (Badges for Motor Vehicles) (Amendment) Regulations 1991 SI 1991/2708
Local Authorities' Traffic Orders (Exemptions for Disabled Persons) (England and Wales) (Amendment) Regulations 1991 SI 1991/2709
Road Vehicles (Construction and Use) (Amendment) (No. 5) Regulations 1991 SI 1991/2710
Local Government Act 1988 (Competition) (Leeds City Council) (Refuse Collection) Regulations 1991 SI 1991/2711
Library Charges (England and Wales) Regulations 1991 SI 1991/2712
A6 London–Inverness Trunk Road (Rothwell Interchange) Detrunking Order 1991 SI 1991/2713
Local Authorities' Traffic Orders (Exemptions for Disabled Persons) (Scotland) Regulations 1991 SI 1991/2714
Armed Forces Act 1991 (Commencement No.1) SI 1991/2719
Armed Forces (Compensation Limits) Order 1991 SI 1991/2720
British Technology Group Act 1991 (Appointed Day) Order 1991 SI 1991/2721
British Technology Group Act 1991 (Nominated Company) Order 1991 SI 1991/2722
A428 Trunk Road (Bedford Southern Bypass) Order 1991 SI 1991/2723
Customs Controls on Importation of Goods Regulations 1991 SI 1991/2724
Customs Warehousing Regulations 1991 SI 1991/2725
Customs Warehousing (Victualling) Regulations 1991 SI 1991/2726
Free Zone Regulations 1991 SI 1991/2727
Planning and Compensation Act 1991 (Commencement No. 4 and Transitional Provisions) Order 1991 SI 1991/2728
Partnerships (Unrestricted Size) No. 8 Regulations 1991 SI 1991/2729
Courts and Legal Services Act 1990 (Commencement No. 7) Order 1991 SI 1991/2730
Judicial Pensions (Widowers' and Children's Benefits) Regulations 1991 SI 1991/2731
Acquisition of Land (Rate of Interest after Entry) Regulations 1991 SI 1991/2732
Acquisition of Land (Rate of Interest after Entry) (Scotland) Regulations 1991 SI 1991/2733
Banking Act 1987 (Exempt Persons) Order 1991 SI 1991/2734
Town and Country Planning (Fees for Applications and Deemed Applications) (Amendment) Regulations 1991 SI 1991/2735
Insurance Companies (Accounts and Statements) (Amendment) Regulations 1991 SI 1991/2736
Naval Courts-Martial General Orders (Royal Navy) 1991 SI 1991/2737
Building Societies Act 1986 (Modifications) (No. 2) Order 1991 SI 1991/2738
Civil Aviation (Route Charges for Navigation Services) (Third Amendment) Regulations 1991 SI 1991/2739
Social Security (Attendance Allowance) Regulations 1991 SI 1991/2740
Social Security (Claims and Payments) Amendment Regulations 1991 SI 1991/2741
Disability Living Allowance and Disability Working Allowance (Consequential Provisions) Regulations 1991 SI 1991/2742
Protection of Wrecks (Designation No. 2) Order 1991 SI 1991/2746
Electrically, Hydraulically and Oil-Electrically Operated Lifts (Components) (EEC Requirements) Regulations 1991 SI 1991/2748
Simple Pressure Vessels (Safety) Regulations 1991 SI 1991/2749
Stansted Airport London (Cargo Area Designation) Order 1991 SI 1991/2750
Town and Country Planning (Fees for Applications and Deemed Applications) (Scotland) Amendment Regulations 1991 SI 1991/2765
Food Protection (Emergency Prohibitions) (Radioactivity in Sheep) Partial Revocation Order 1991 SI 1991/2766
Haddock (Specified Sea Areas) (Prohibition of Fishing) Order 1991 SI 1991/2767
Building Regulations 1991 SI 1991/2768
Petty Sessional Divisions (Avon) Order 1991 SI 1991/2769
Hearing Aid Council Investigating and Disciplinary Committee Rules Approval Instrument 1991 SI 1991/2770
A13 Trunk Road (Movers Lane Flyover, Barking and Dagenham) (Weight Restriction) Order 1991 SI 1991/2771
Social Security (Credits) Amendment Regulations 1991 SI 1991/2772
Waltham Forest Housing Action Trust (Area and Constitution) Order 1991 SI 1991/2773
Personal Equity Plan (Amendment No. 2) Regulations 1991 SI 1991/2774
Housing Revenue Account General Fund Contribution Limits (Scotland) Order 1991 SI 1991/2775
Food Protection (Emergency Prohibitions) (Radioactivity in Sheep) (England) (Partial Revocation) Order 1991 SI 1991/2776
Education (London Residuary Body) (Property Transfer) (No. 4) Order 1991 SI 1991/2778
Provision of Confidential Statistical Informationto the Statistical Office of the European Communities (Restriction on Disclosure) Regulations 1991 SI 1991/2779
Food Protection (Emergency Prohibitions) (Radioactivity in Sheep) (Wales) (Partial Revocation) Order 1991 SI 1991/2780
Non-Domestic Rating Contributions (Wales) (Amendment) Regulations 1991 SI 1991/2781
Local Government Act 1988 (Defined Activities) (Competition) (England) (Amendment) (No. 2) Regulations 1991 SI 1991/2782
Local Government Act 1988 (Defined Activities) (Exemptions) (England) (No. 3) Order 1991 SI 1991/2783
Civil Legal Aid (General) (Amendment) (No. 3) Regulations 1991 SI 1991/2784
Rules of Procedure (Air Force) (Amendment) Rules 1991 SI 1991/2786
Rules of Procedure (Army) (Amendment) Rules 1991 SI 1991/2787
Standing Civilian Courts (Areas) (Amendment) Order 1991 SI 1991/2788
A406 London North Circular Trunk Road (A1 Great North Way/Falloden Way, A598 Regents Park Road/Finchley Road Junctions Improvements) Trunk Roads and Slip Roads Order 1991 SI 1991/2789
Private Water Supplies Regulations 1991 SI 1991/2790
Motor Vehicles (Tests) (Amendment)(No. 5) Regulations 1991 SI 1991/2791
Civil Aviation (Joint Financing) (Third Amendment) Regulations 1991 SI 1991/2792
Non-Domestic Rating Contributions (England) (Amendment) Regulations 1991 SI 1991/2793
Town and Country Planning (Development Plan) Regulations 1991 SI 1991/2794

2801-2900
Town and Country Planning (Enforcement Notices and Appeals) Regulations 1991 SI 1991/2804
Town and Country Planning General Development (Amendment) (No. 3) Order 1991 SI 1991/2805
Sole (Specified Sea Areas) (Prohibition of Fishing) Order 1991 SI 1991/2806
Personal Community Charge (Reduction Scheme) (England) Regulations 1991 SI 1991/2807
Income Tax (Purchased Life Annuities) (Amendment) Regulations 1991 SI 1991/2808
Peak Rail Light Railway Order 1991 SI 1991/2812
Sex Discrimination Act 1975 (Exemption of Special Treatment for Lone Parents) Order 1991 SI 1991/2813
Anthrax Order 1991 SI 1991/2814
Domestic Property (Valuation) (Amendment) Regulations 1991 SI 1991/2815
Marriage Fees (Scotland) Regulations 1991 SI 1991/2816
Registration of Births, Deaths, Marriages and Divorces (Fees) (Scotland) Regulations 1991 SI 1991/2817
Registration of Births, Deaths and Marriages (Fees) (Scotland) Order 1991 SI 1991/2818
Western Isles Islands Council (Hushinish) Water Order 1991 SI 1991/2819
Western Isles Islands Council (Govig) Water Order 1991 SI 1991/2820
Lancashire County Council (New Shard Bridge) Scheme 1988 Confirmation Instrument 1991 SI 1991/2823
Fertilisers (Sampling and Analysis) (Amendment) Regulations 1991 SI 1991/2824
Food Premises (Registration) Regulations 1991 SI 1991/2825
Electrical Equipment for Explosive Atmospheres (Certification) (Amendment) (No. 2) Regulations 1991 SI 1991/2826
 The Northavon (Parishes) Order 1991 S.I. 1991/2827
Scottish Seed Potato Development Council (Amendment) Order 1991 SI 1991/2828
Environmental Protection Act 1990 (Commencement No. 10) Order 1991 SI 1991/2829
Motor Vehicles (Type Approval) (Amendment) (No. 3) Regulations 1991 SI 1991/2830
Registered Foreign Lawyers Order 1991 SI 1991/2831
A1 Trunk Road (Islington) Red Route Experimental Traffic (Amendment) (No.2) Order 1991 SI 1991/2838
Environmental Protection (Duty of Care) Regulations 1991 SI 1991/2839
Feeding Stuffs Regulations 1991 SI 1991/2840
Animals, Meat and Meat Products (Examination for Residues and Maximum limits) Regulations 1991 SI 1991/2843
Consumer Credit (Exempt Agreements) (Amendment) (No. 3) Order 1991 SI 1991/2844
Education (School Government) (Amendment) Regulations SI 1991/2845
Mackerel (Specified Sea Areas) (Prohibition of Fishing) Order 1991 SI 1991/2849
British Railways (Penalty Fares) Act 1989 (Activating No. 2) Order 1991 SI 1991/2853
A50 and A453 Trunk Roads (Flagstaff Interchange and Link Road) Detrunking Order 1991 SI 1991/2859
Finance Act 1990, section 46, (Appointed Day) Order 1991 SI 1991/2860
Law Reform (Miscellaneous Provisions) (Scotland) Act 1990 (Commencement No. 9) Order 1991 SI 1991/2862
Saithe (Specified Sea Areas) (Prohibition of Fishing) Order 1991 SI 1991/2863
Broadcasting (Programme Contractors' Additional Payments) Order 1991 SI 1991/2868
Police (Amendment) (No. 3) Regulations 1991 SI 1991/2869
Child Abduction and Custody (Parties to Conventions) (Amendment) (No. 4) Order 1991 SI 1991/2870
Virgin Islands (Constitution) (Amendment) Order 1991 SI 1991/2871
Children and Young Persons (Protection from Tobacco) (Northern Ireland) Order 1991 SI 1991/2872
Criminal Justice Act 1988 (Designated Countries and Territories) Order 1991 SI 1991/2873
Disability Living Allowance and Disability Working Allowance (Northern Ireland Consequential Amendments) Order 1991 SI 1991/2874
Merchant Shipping Act 1988 (Guernsey) Order 1991 SI 1991/2875
Double Taxation Relief (Taxes on Income) (Czechoslovakia) Order 1991 SI 1991/2876
Double Taxation Relief (Taxes on Income) (Denmark) Order 1991 SI 1991/2877
Double Taxation Relief (Taxes on Income) (Finland) Order 1991 SI 1991/2878
Double Taxation Relief (Taxes on Income) (Iceland) Order 1991 SI 1991/2879
Double Taxation Relief (Taxes on Income) (Isle of Man) Order 1991 SI 1991/2880
Double Taxation Relief (Taxes on Income) (Morocco) Order 1991 SI 1991/2881
Double Taxation Relief (Taxes on Income) (Papua New Guinea) Order 1991 SI 1991/2882
Criminal Procedure (Scotland) Act 1975 (Commencement No. 1) Order 1991 SI 1991/2883
Maximum Number of Judges (Scotland) Order 1991 SI 1991/2884
Merchant Shipping (Prevention of Oil Pollution) (Amendment) Order 1991 SI 1991/2885
Ministerial and other Salaries Order 1991 SI 1991/2886
Disability Working Allowance (General) Regulations 1991 SI 1991/2887
Guaranteed Minimum Pensions Increase (No.2) Order 1991 SI 1991/2888
Social Security (Adjudication) Amendment (No. 3) Regulations 1991 SI 1991/2889
Social Security (Disability Living Allowance) Regulations 1991 SI 1991/2890
Social Security (Introduction of Disability Living Allowance) Regulations 1991 SI 1991/2891
Smoke Control Areas (Exempted Fireplaces) Order 1991 SI 1991/2892
A1 Trunk Road (Brownieside De-Trunking) Order 1991 SI 1991/2893
A1 Trunk Road (Brownieside Improvement) Order 1991 SI 1991/2894
Domestic Property (Valuation) (Scotland) Amendment Regulations 1991 SI 1991/2895
Education (National Curriculum) (Attainment Targets and Programmes of Study in Mathematics) Order 1991 SI 1991/2896
Education (National Curriculum) (Attainment Targets and Programmes of Study in Science) Order 1991 SI 1991/2897
South Ayrshire Hospitals National Health Service Trust (Establishment) Order 1991 SI 1991/2898
Foresterhill Hospitals National Health Service Trust (Establishment) Order 1991 SI 1991/2899
Milk and Dairies and Milk (Special Designation) (Charges) (Amendment) Regulations 1991 SI 1991/2900

2901-3000
Food Protection (Emergency Prohibitions) (Paralytic Shellfish Poisoning) (No. 13) Order 1991 SI 1991/2901
Food Protection (Emergency Prohibitions) (Paralytic Shellfish Poisoning) (No. 14) Order 1991 SI 1991/2902
Planning and Compensation Act 1991 (Commencement No. 5 and Transitional Provisions) Order 1991 SI 1991/2905
Non-Domestic Rating (Ports of London and Tilbury) Regulations 1991 SI 1991/2906
Nurses, Midwives and Health Visitors (Registered Fever Nurses and Nurses with Ortopaedic and Ophthalmic Qualifications) Amendment Rules Approval Order 1991 SI 1991/2907
Tees and Hartlepool Port Authority Scheme 1991 Confirmation Order 1991 SI 1991/2908
Social Security (Contributions) (Re-rating) (No. 2) Order 1991 SI 1991/2909
Social Security Benefits Up-rating (No. 2) Order 1991 SI 1991/2910
Statutory Sick Pay (Rate of Payment) (No. 2) Order 1991 SI 1991/2911
Wrexham and East Denbighshire Water Order 1991 SI 1991/2912
Milford Port Health Authority Order 1991 SI 1991/2913
Petty Sessional Divisions (Staffordshire) Order 1991 SI 1991/2914
Combined Probation Areas (Staffordshire) Order 1991 SI 1991/2915
Combined Probation Areas (Cheshire) Order 1991 SI 1991/2916
Combined Probation Areas (Cambridgeshire) Order 1991 SI 1991/2917
Combined Probation Areas (Avon) Order 1991 SI 1991/2918
Combined Probation Areas (Norfolk) Order 1991 SI 1991/2919
Teachers (Education, Training and Registration) (Scotland) Amendment Regulations 1991 SI 1991/2921
Nature Conservancy Council (Dissolution) Order 1991 SI 1991/2923
Non-Domestic Rating (Appropriate Fraction and Rateable Values) Order 1991 SI 1991/2924
Customs Duties (ECSC) (Quota and other Reliefs) Order 1991 SI 1991/2925
Rochdale Healthcare National Service Trust (Establishment) Order 1991 SI 1991/2926
Imported Food and Feedingstuffs (Safeguards against Cholera) (Amendment) Regulations 1991 SI 1991/2934
Tayside Regional Council (Allt Girnaig, Moulin) (Amendment) Water Order 1991 SI 1991/2939
Local Government and Housing Act 1989 (Commencement No. 13) Order 1991 SI 1991/2940
Education Support Grants (Amendment) Regulations 1991 SI 1991/2943
Teachers' Pay and Conditions Act 1987 (Continuation) Order 1991 SI 1991/2944
Companies Act 1989 (Commencement No. 14 and Transitional Provision) Order 1991 SI 1991/2945

See also
 List of Statutory Instruments of the United Kingdom

External links
Legislation.gov.uk delivered by the UK National Archive
UK SI's on legislation.gov.uk
UK Draft SI's on legislation.gov.uk

Lists of Statutory Instruments of the United Kingdom
Statutory Instruments